= Papanasam =

- Panchayat Town/Sub urban
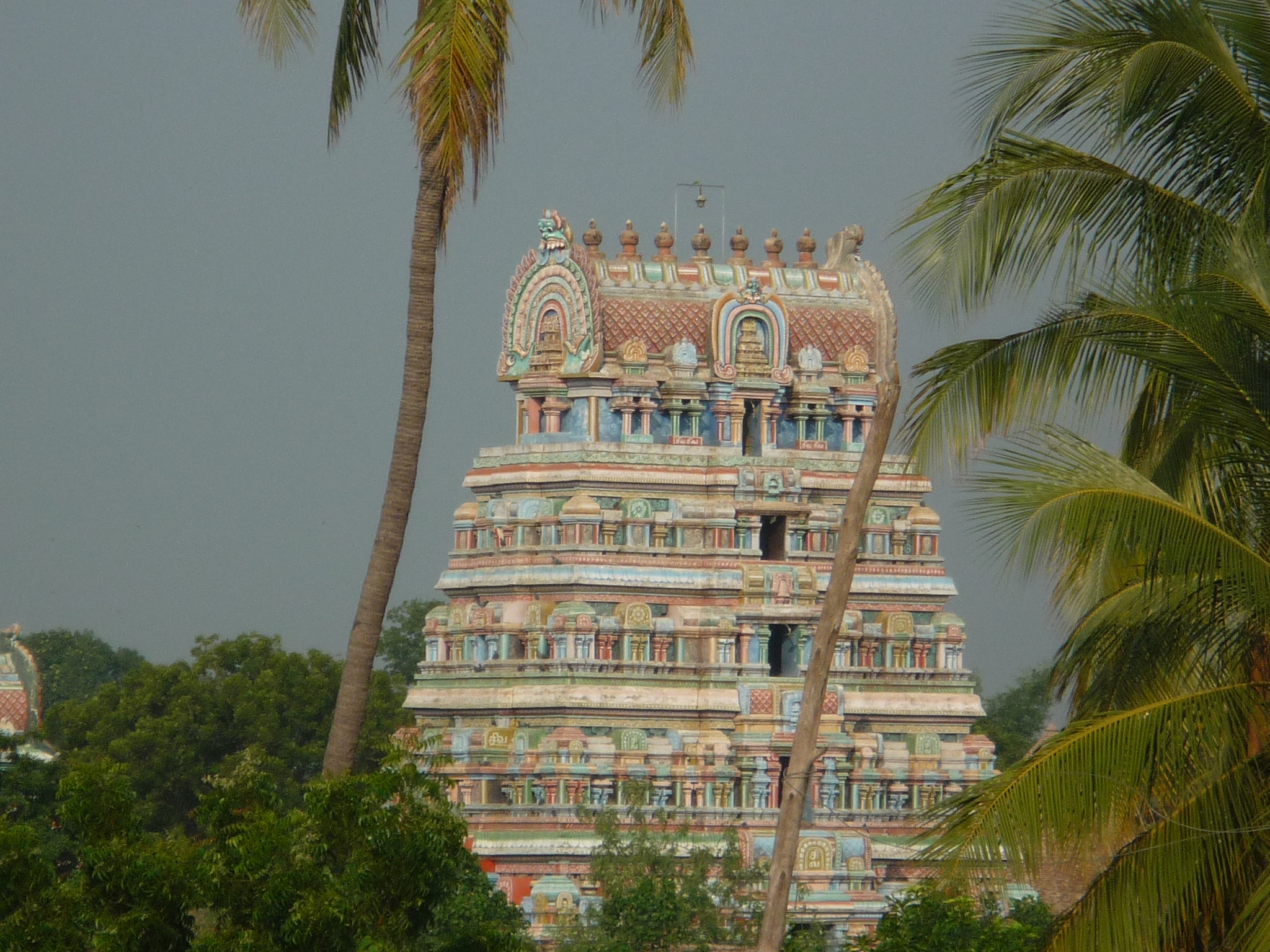
- Palaivananathar Sivan Koil

- Location in Tamil Nadu, India
- Coordinates: 10.9333°N 79.2833°E
- Country: India
- State: Tamil Nadu
- District: Thanjavur
- Elevation: 22 m (72 ft)

Population (2001)
  - Total: 16,397

Languages
  - Official: Tamil
- Time zone: UTC+5:30 (IST)
- PIN: 614 205
- Telephone code: 914374
- Vehicle registration: TN-68

Papanasam is a panchayat town in Thanjavur district in the Indian state of Tamil Nadu. It is located 25 kilometres (16 mi) from Thanjavur and 15 kilometres (9.3 mi) from Kumbakonam. The name literally translates to "Destruction of Sins" in the Tamil language. It is the suburban region of Kumbakonam.

== Geography ==
=== Climate ===
Papanasam is located at 10.9333°N 79.2833°E and has an average elevation of 22 metres (72 ft). Köppen-Geiger climate classification system classifies its climate as tropical wet and dry.

Climate data for Papanasam (elevation: 37m)
Month	Jan	Feb	Mar	Apr	May	Jun	Jul	Aug	Sep	Oct	Nov	Dec	Year
Mean daily maximum °C (°F)	29.3 (84.7)	31.1 (88.0)	33.6 (92.5)	35.3 (95.5)	36.7 (98.1)	36.7 (98.1)	35.4 (95.7)	34.8 (94.6)	34.2 (93.6)	32.1 (89.8)	29.7 (85.5)	28.5 (83.3)	33.1 (91.6)
Daily mean °C (°F)	25.3 (77.5)	26.5 (79.7)	28.5 (83.3)	30.6 (87.1)	31.7 (89.1)	31.6 (88.9)	30.7 (87.3)	30 (86)	29.6 (85.3)	28.2 (82.8)	26.4 (79.5)	25.1 (77.2)	28.7 (83.6)
Mean daily minimum °C (°F)	21.3 (70.3)	21.9 (71.4)	23.5 (74.3)	26 (79)	26.8 (80.2)	26.6 (79.9)	26.1 (79.0)	25.3 (77.5)	25.1 (77.2)	24.3 (75.7)	23.1 (73.6)	21.8 (71.2)	24.3 (75.8)
Average precipitation mm (inches)	35 (1.4)	12 (0.5)	13 (0.5)	36 (1.4)	55 (2.2)	39 (1.5)	60 (2.4)	134 (5.3)	99 (3.9)	198 (7.8)	208 (8.2)	137 (5.4)	1,026 (40.5)
Source: Climate-Data.org (altitude: 37m)

Climate data for Papanasam (elevation: 76m)
Month	Jan	Feb	Mar	Apr	May	Jun	Jul	Aug	Sep	Oct	Nov	Dec	Year
Mean daily maximum °C (°F)	30 (86)	31.5 (88.7)	33.2 (91.8)	33.5 (92.3)	33.7 (92.7)	32.2 (90.0)	31.3 (88.3)	31.7 (89.1)	32.1 (89.8)	31.2 (88.2)	29.6 (85.3)	29.4 (84.9)	31.6 (88.9)
Daily mean °C (°F)	26.1 (79.0)	27.1 (80.8)	28.6 (83.5)	29.4 (84.9)	29.8 (85.6)	28.7 (83.7)	28 (82)	28.2 (82.8)	28.3 (82.9)	27.7 (81.9)	26.4 (79.5)	25.9 (78.6)	27.9 (82.1)
Mean daily minimum °C (°F)	22.2 (72.0)	22.7 (72.9)	24.4 (75.9)	25.4 (77.7)	26 (79)	25.2 (77.4)	24.8 (76.6)	24.8 (76.6)	24.6 (76.3)	24.2 (75.6)	23.3 (73.9)	22.4 (72.3)	24.2 (75.5)
Average precipitation mm (inches)	37 (1.5)	30 (1.2)	49 (1.9)	88 (3.5)	82 (3.2)	101 (4.0)	79 (3.1)	47 (1.9)	63 (2.5)	202 (8.0)	204 (8.0)	93 (3.7)	1,075 (42.5)
Source: Climate-Data.org (altitude: 76m)

== Demographics ==
=== Population ===
As of 2001 India census, Papanasam had a population of 16,397. Males constitute 50% of the population and females 50%. Papanasam has an average literacy rate of 76%, higher than the national average of 59.5%: male literacy is 82%, and female literacy is 70%. In Papanasam, 11% of the population is under 6 years of age.

== Government and politics ==
Papanasam assembly constituency is part of Mayiladuthurai Lok Sabha constituency.

== Culture/Cityscape ==
Papanasam (Thanjavur) (Tamil: பாபநாசம், literally means Destruction of Sins) is a panchayat town in Thanjavur district in the Indian state of Tamil Nadu, located 14 km (8.7 mi) from Kumbakonam and 28 km (17 mi) from Thanjavur on the Kumbakonam - Thanjavur highway.

=== Tourist Attractions ===
There are three major temples, Pallaivanatha Swamy temple constructed by the Cholas, Srinivasa Perumal Temple and 108 Sivalayam temple. A granary measuring 86 feet (26 m) in width and 36 feet (11 m) in height constructed by Nayaks between 1600 and 1634 has been declared by the State Archaeological Department as a protected monument.

== Transport ==
=== Air ===
Nearby Airport is Tiruchirappalli (TRZ) Airport which is 78 km distance

=== Rail ===
Papanasam railway station is situated between Thanjavur and Kumbakonam.

=== Road ===
Papanasam Bus stop is situated between Thanjavur to Kumbakonam route. Route Buses are available every 10 minutes. Papanasam Bus Stand is available from which people can get local buses and mini buses to villages around Papanasam.

== Notable people ==
- Papanasam Sivan, classical singer.
- Ravi Shankar, spiritual leader.
- G. K. Vasan, Former union minister, President Tamil Manila congress.
- G. K. Moopanar, Leader AICC.
- R. Doraikkannu, Agriculture Minister Tamil Nadu.
- M. Ramkumar, Former member legislative assembly, Former Chairman district panchayat.
- N.Ravivarma, leading industrialist and philanthropist.
