= Srinivasa Perumal Temple =

Srinivasa Perumal Temple may refer to the following Vishnu Hindu temples in Tamil Nadu, India:

- Purasawalkam Srinivasa Perumal Temple, Chennai
- Sri Santhana Srinivasa Perumal Temple, Chennai
- Srinivasa Perumal Temple, Egmore, Chennai
- Srinivasa Perumal Temple, Kudavasal, Thiruvarur
- Srinivasa Perumal Temple, Papanasam, Thanjavur
- Srinivasa Perumal Temple, Tirukulandhai, Perungulam
