= Thanjavur district =

- District
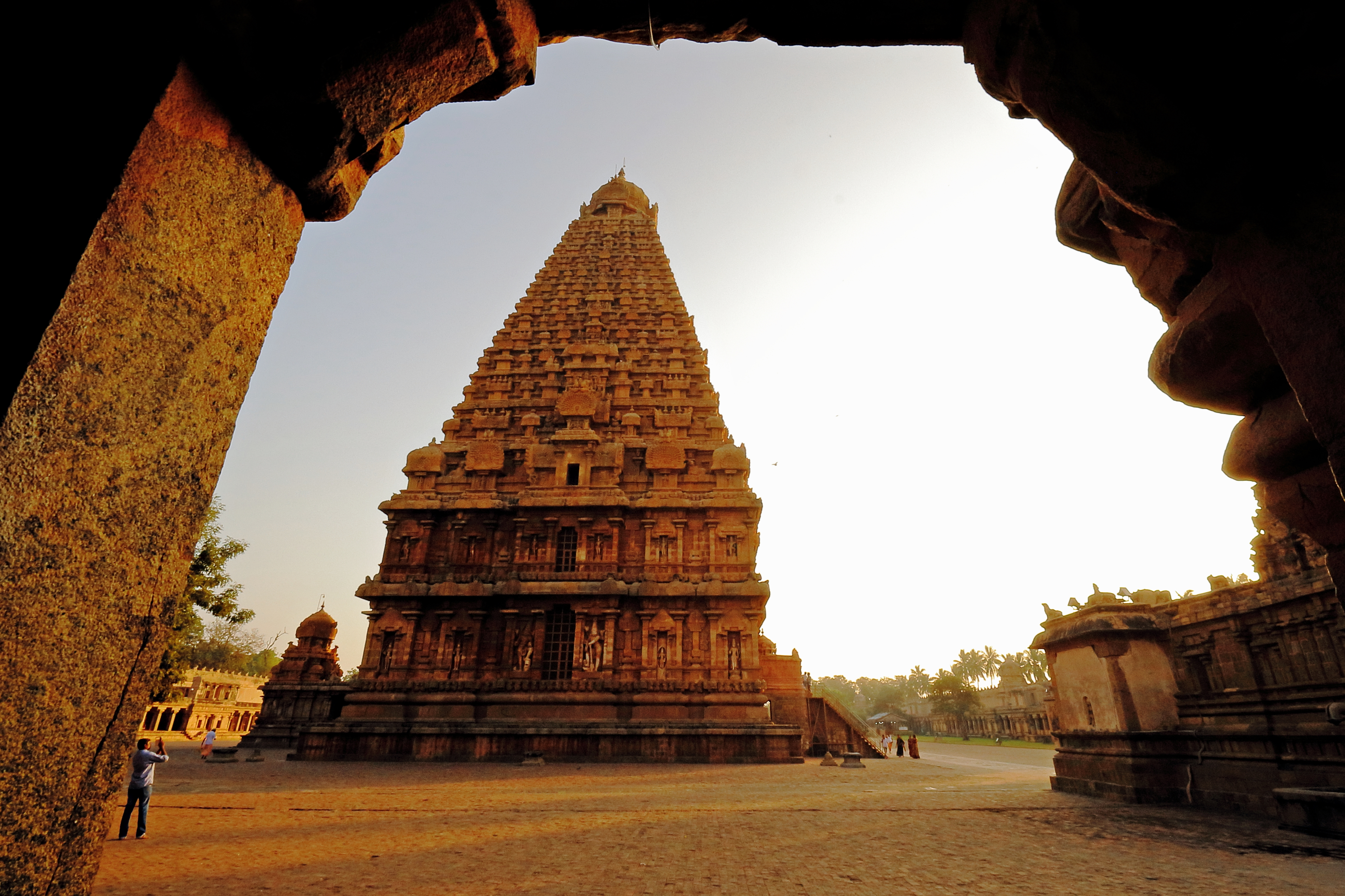
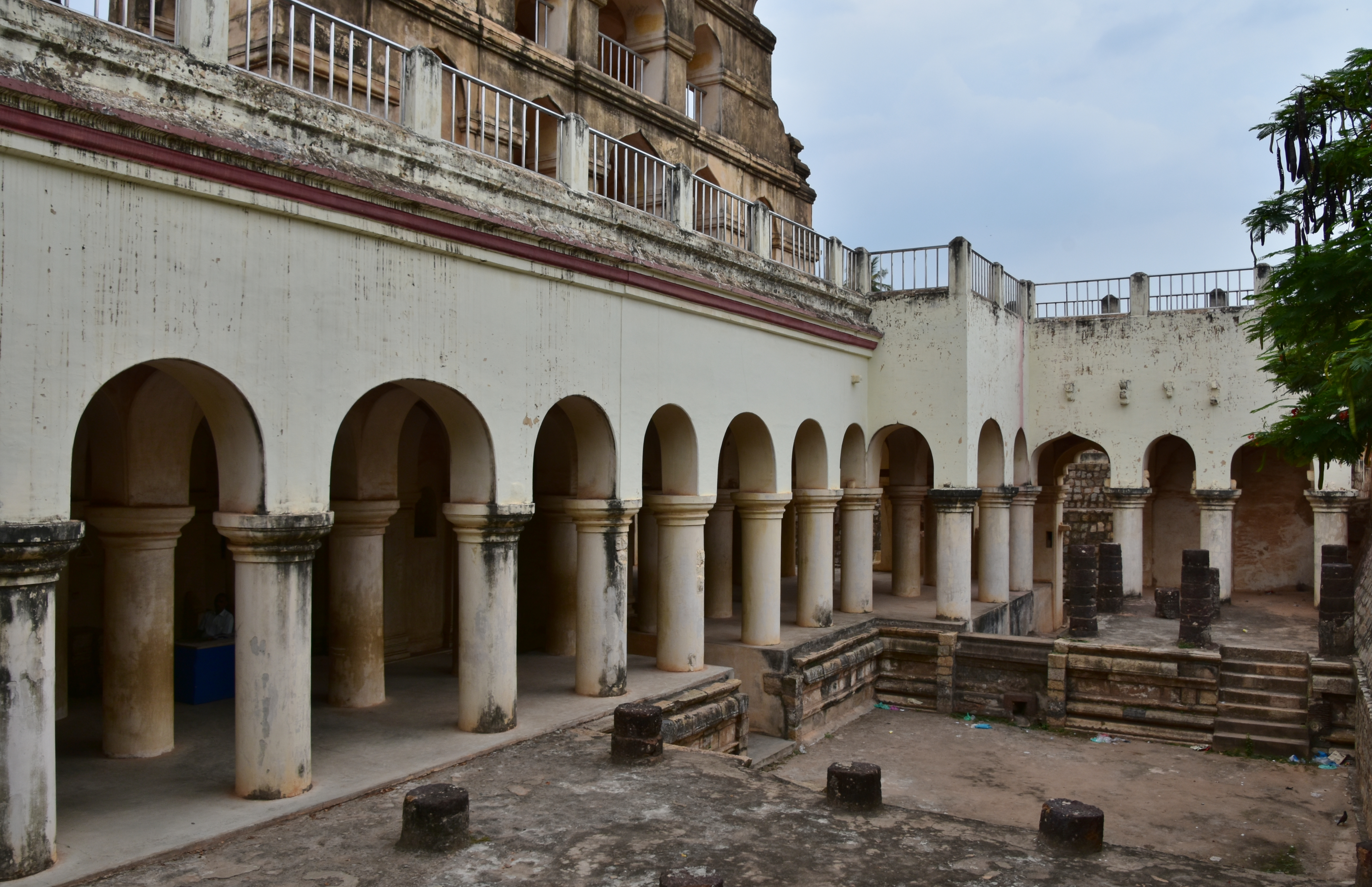
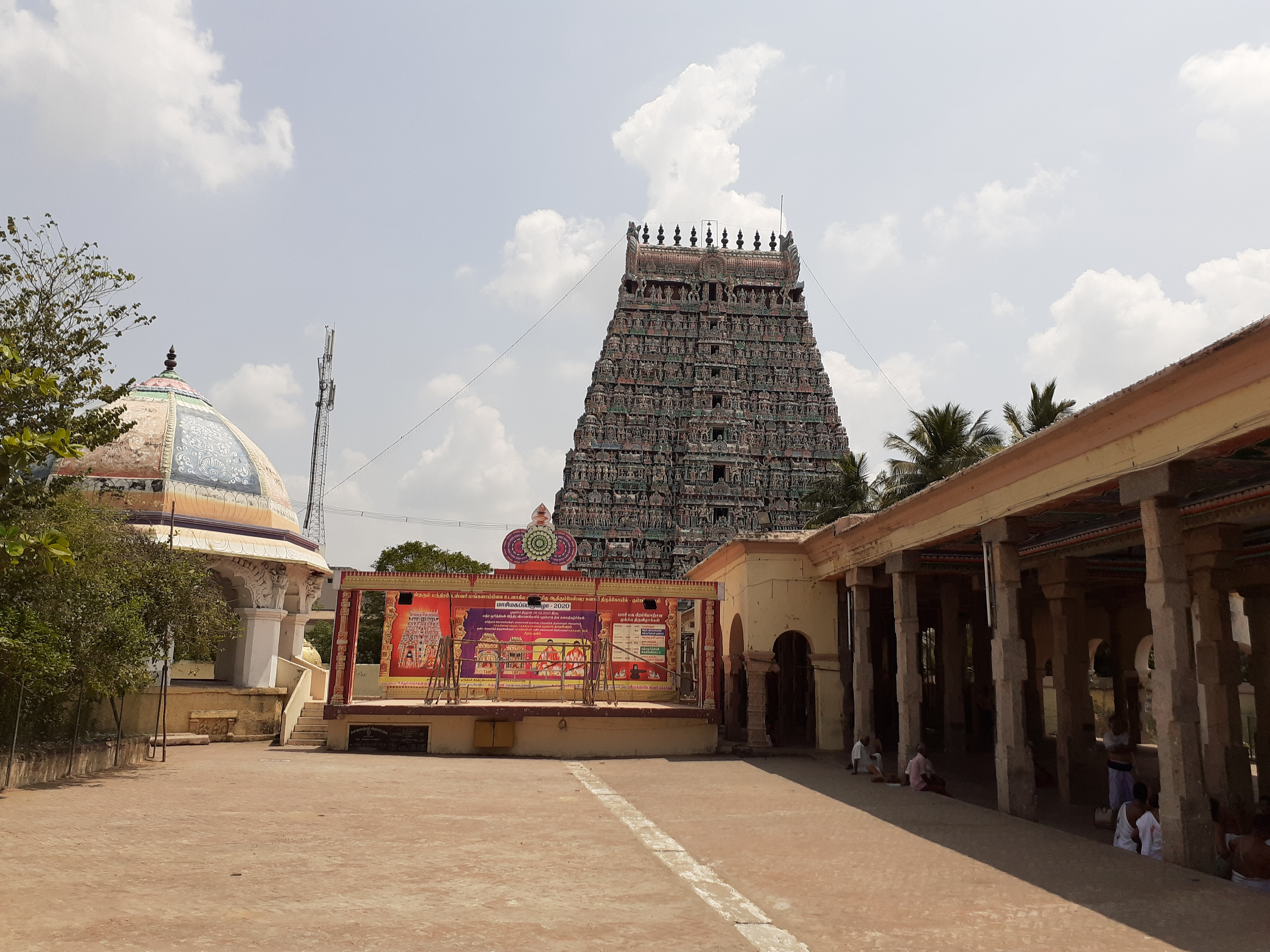
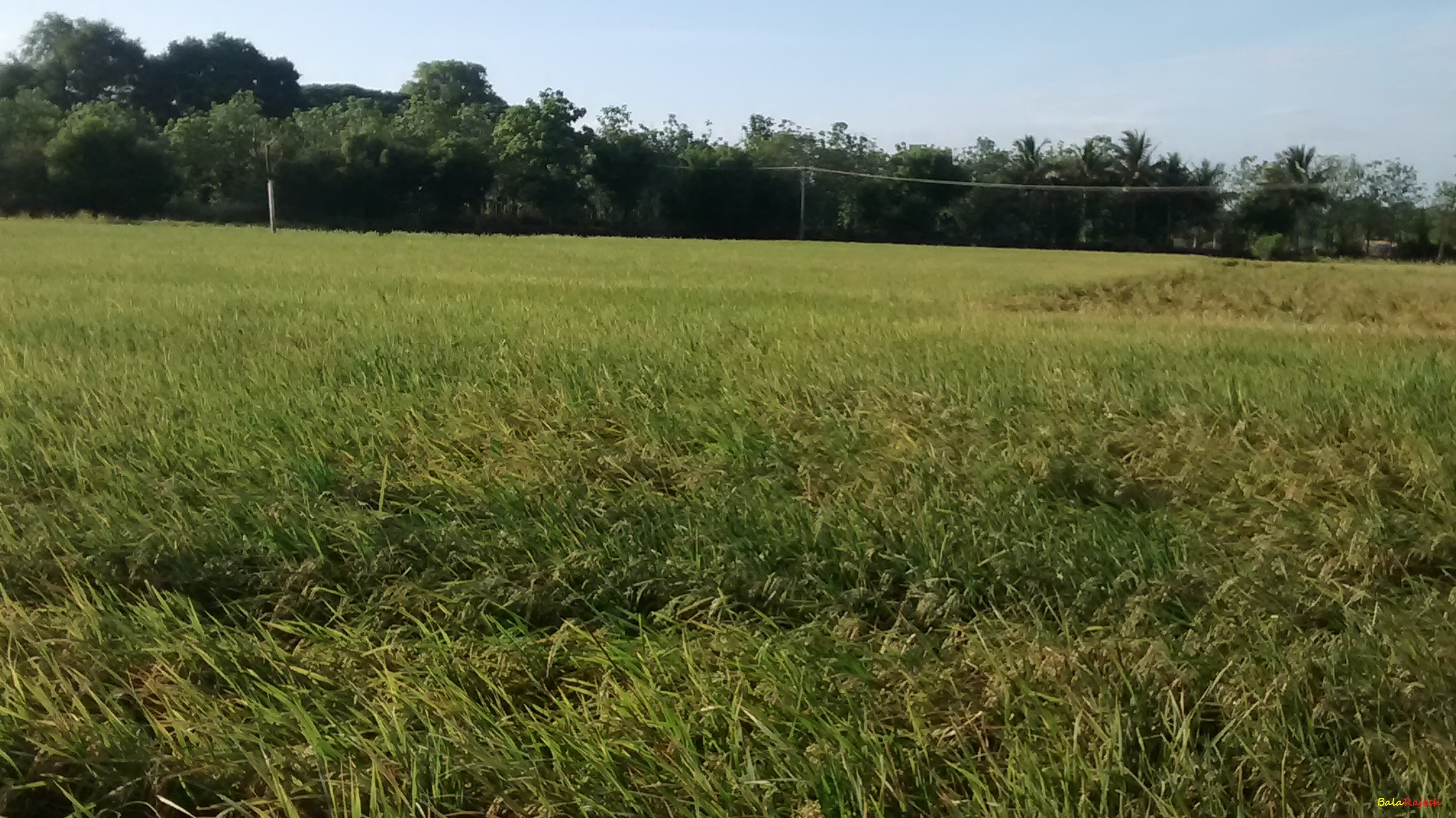
- Clockwise from top left: Periya Kovil; Thanjavur Royal Palace, and Kumbeswarar Temple in Kumbakonam
- Nickname: Rice Bowl of Tamil Nadu
- Location in Tamil Nadu
- Coordinates: 10°47′8.16″N 79°8′24.36″E
- Country: India
- State: Tamil Nadu
- Municipal Corporations: Thanjavur, Kumbakonam
- Municipalities: Pattukkottai, Adirampattinam, Thiruvaiyaru
- Largest city: Thanjavur
- Founder: Raja Raja Chola I
- Headquarters: Thanjavur
- Talukas: Budalur, Kumbakonam, Orathanadu, Papanasam, Pattukkottai, Peravurani, Thanjavur, Thiruvaiyaru, Thiruvidaimarudur, Thiruvonam

Government
  - District Collector: Priyanka Pankajam, IAS
  - Superintendent of Police: Sundaravathanam, IPS

Population (2011)
  - Total: 2,405,890

Languages
  - Official: Tamil
- Time zone: UTC+5:30 (IST)
- PIN: 613xxx
- Telephone code: 04362,0435
- ISO 3166 code: ISO 3166-2:IN
- Vehicle registration: TN-49, TN-68
- Website: thanjavur.nic.in

Thanjavur district is one of the 38 districts in the Indian state of Tamil Nadu. Its administrative headquarters is Thanjavur (Tanjore). The district is located in the fertile delta of the Kavery River and has its economy centered largely on agriculture.

== Geography ==
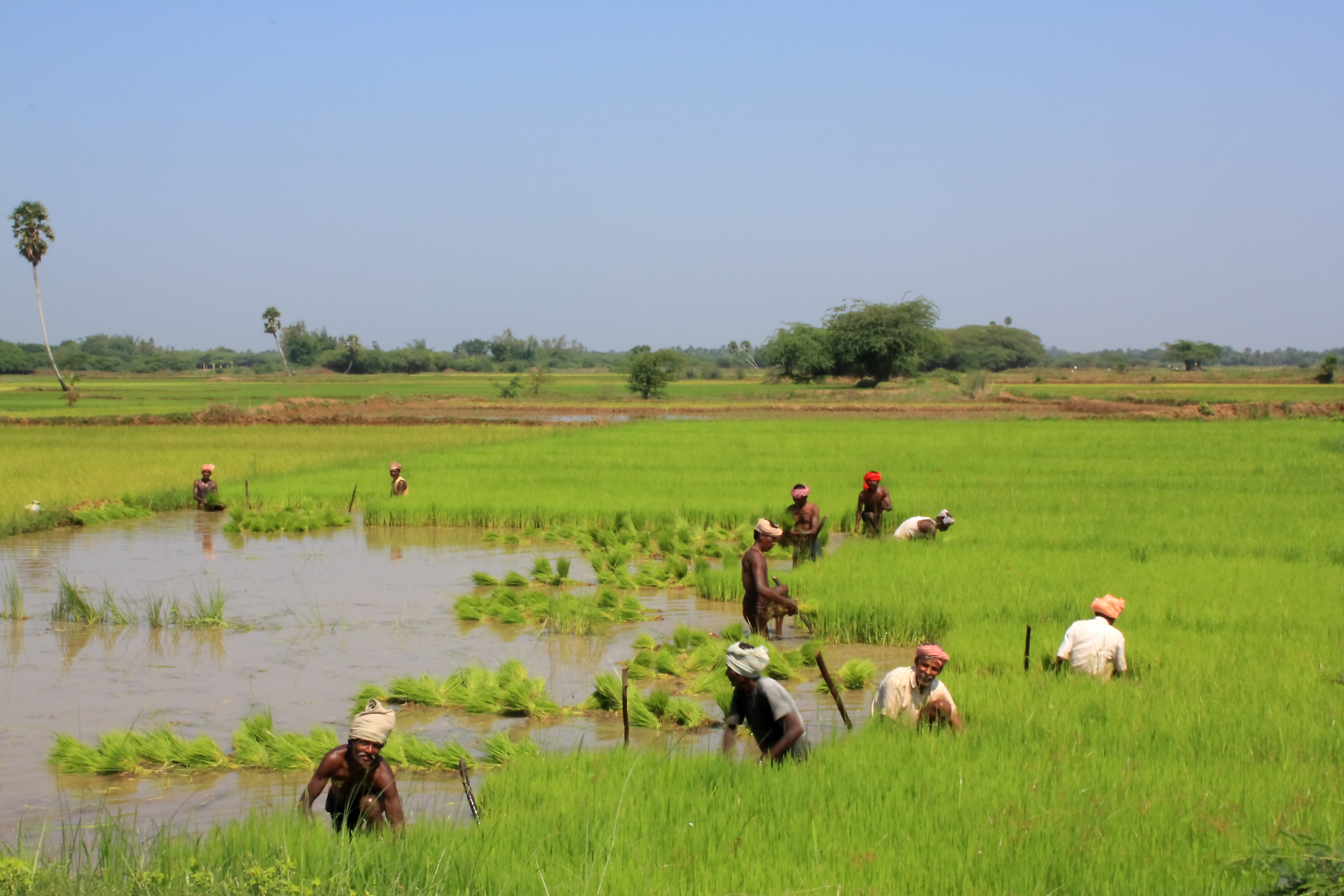
Agriculture—especially rice cultivation—is the main occupation in Thanjavur district.

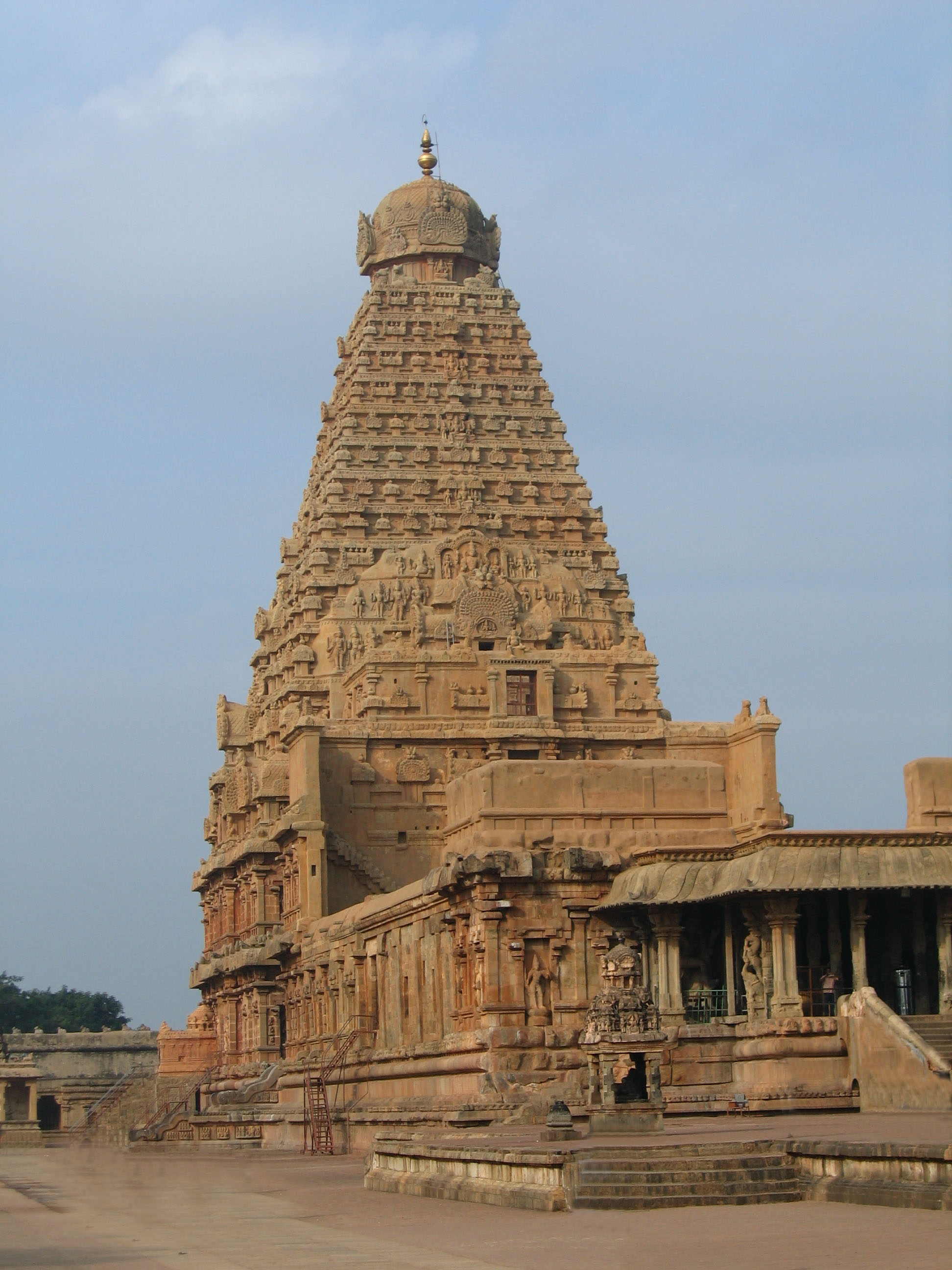
The Brihadisvara Temple at Thanjavur

The district is located at 10.08°N 79.16°E in Central Tamil Nadu. It is bounded by Mayiladuthurai district to the northeast, Tiruvarur District to the east, Palk Strait of Bay of Bengal to the south, and Pudukkottai and Tiruchirappalli districts to the west. To the north, the Kollidam River forms the boundary separating Thanjavur from Tiruchirappalli and Ariyalur districts.

== Demographics ==
Historical population
Year	Pop.	±% p.a.
1901	928,222	—
1911	978,651	+0.53%
1921	958,929	−0.20%
1931	986,308	+0.28%
1941	1,059,583	+0.72%
1951	1,228,360	+1.49%
1961	1,317,920	+0.71%
1971	1,592,998	+1.91%
1981	1,848,132	+1.50%
1991	2,053,760	+1.06%
2001	2,216,138	+0.76%
2011	2,405,890	+0.82%

Religions in Thanjavur district (2011)
Religion	Percent
Hinduism	86.28%
Islam	7.93%
Christianity	5.57%
Other or not stated	0.22%

According to the 2011 census, Thanjavur district had a population of 2,405,890 with a sex ratio of 1,035 females per 1,000 males, exceeding the national average of 929. Urban areas accounted for 35.39% of the population. Children under six years of age were 238,598 (121,949 males and 116,649 females). Scheduled Castes and Scheduled Tribes accounted for 18.91% and 0.15% of the population, respectively. The average literacy rate was 74.44%, compared to the national average of 72.99%. The district had a total of 605,363 households and a workforce of 974,079 workers, consisting of 117,321 cultivators, 327,673 main agricultural labourers, 26,430 household industry workers, 363,060 other main workers, 139,595 marginal workers, 12,592 marginal cultivators, 87,688 marginal agricultural labourers, 4,770 marginal workers in household industries and 34,545 other marginal workers.

Languages of Thanjavur district (2011)
1. Tamil (97.4%)
2. Saurashtra (1.07%)
3. Others (1.51%)

At the 2011 census, Tamil was the primary language of 97.42% of the population, while Saurashtra was spoken by 1.07%.

== Politics ==
District	No.	Constituency	Name	Party	Alliance	Remarks
Thanjavur	170	Thiruvidaimarudur	Govi. Chezhian	DMK	SPA	
Thanjavur	171	Kumbakonam	R. Vinoth	TVK	TVK+	Cabinet Minister
Thanjavur	172	Papanasam	A. M. Shahjahan	IUML	TVK+	Won as SPA candidate; party switched to TVK+ post-election; Cabinet Minister
Thanjavur	173	Thiruvaiyaru	Durai Chandrasekaran	DMK	SPA	
Thanjavur	174	Thanjavur	R. Vijaysaravanan	TVK	TVK+	
Thanjavur	175	Orathanadu	R. Vaithilingam	DMK	SPA	
Thanjavur	176	Pattukkottai	K. Annadurai	DMK	SPA	
Thanjavur	177	Peravurani	N. Ashokkumar	DMK	SPA	

== Economy ==
=== Agriculture ===
Thanjavur district is located in the Kaveri delta, the primary agricultural region in Tamil Nadu. It is the state's primary rice-producing area and is commonly referred to as the 'Rice Bowl of Tamil Nadu'. The district's agricultural lands are irrigated by a canal network consisting of Kaveri, Vennar, and Grand Anicut (Kallanai) canal systems. Apart from Paddy, other major crops include sugarcane, coconut, pulses, banana and groundnut. These are supported by agro-processing industries such as rice mills and coir manufacturing units.

== Tourism ==
=== Brihadisvara Temple ===
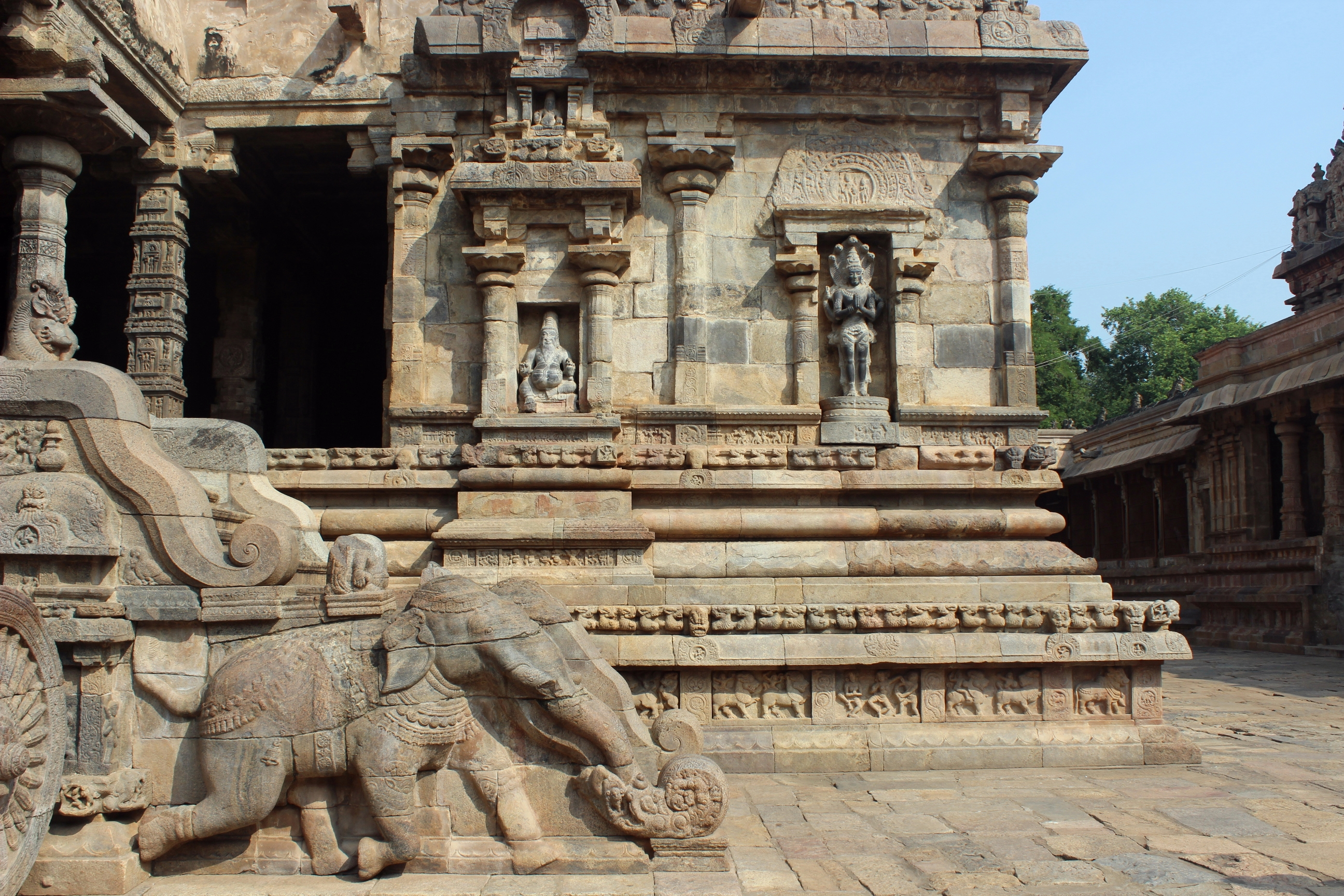
Airavateswara Temple, in Darasuram, near Kumbakonam, Thanjavur district, was built by Rajaraja Chola II in the 12th century CE, and is a UNESCO World Heritage Site.

The Brihadisvara Temple in Thanjavur (also known as Rajarajesvaram or Peruvudaiyār Kōvil), built under the Chola king Rajaraja I in the 11th century, is a UNESCO World Heritage Site recognized for its Dravidian architecture. The 12th-century Airavateswara Temple at Darasuram near Kumbakonam is also an UNESCO World Heritage site as part of the Great Living Chola Temples. Other notable temples include the Prathyangira Devi Temple at Ayyavadi.

=== Manora Fort ===
The Manora Fort is situated in Mallipattinam, 20 km (12 mi) from Pattukkottai and 60 km (37 mi) from Thanjavur. The fort was built between 1814 and 1815 by the Thanjavur Maratha ruler Serfoji II, the eight-story hexagonal tower stands at 75 ft (23 m) overlooking the Bay of Bengal. It was erected to commemorate the British victory over Napoléon Bonaparte at teh Battle of Waterloo. The edifice features arched windows, a circular staircase, and an outer moat.

== Flora and fauna ==
The district's vegetation consists of riverine flora along the Kaveri and Killidam River basins and agricultural wetlands. Common tree species include coconut, palpyra palm, tamarind, neem and banyan. The coastal wetlands and lageens near Mallipattinam and Sethubavachatram host mangrove and function as feeding grounds for migratory birds during winter.

== Cultural significance ==
The district is known for traditional art forms and artisanal crafts, several of which hold Geographical Indication (GI) status. These include the Saraswati veena (a classical plucked string instrument), Thanjavur art plates (reoussé brass and silver relief work), Thanjavur oil paintings (chracterized by gold foil leaf and stone inlays), and Thalaiyatti Bommai (terracotta bobblehead dolls). The town of Swamimalai is also recognized for its lost-wax bronze icon casting.

== Notable people ==
- V. S. Srinivasa Sastri
- Srinivasa Ramanujan
- Sivaji Ganesan, actor and former Rajya Sabha Member
- K. Thulasiah Vandayar, former MP
- G K Moopanar TMC- Congress
- G. K. Vasan Rajya Sabha Member
- S. S. Palanimanickam, former Central Minister
- S.D Somasundaram EX Minister and MP
- Parasuram EX MP – Loksabha
- L. Ganesan – EX MLA, MP, MLC
- R. VaithiyaLingam – Ex Minister and Rajya Sabha Member
- M Ramachandran MLA – DMk
- M. Ramkumar - Ex MLA Papanasam
- Durai Govindarajan EX MLA
- Durai Chandrasekaran MLA
- R. Doraikkannu Ex. Minister for Agricultural, Tamil Nadu
