= M. Ramkumar =

Indian politician

M.Ramkumar
- Born: 18 April 1968 (age 58); Kumbakonam
- Education: B.SC, M.A.
- Alma mater: Jamal Mohamed college, Trichy.
- Occupations: Politician and agriculturist
- Years active: 1988–present
- Successor: R.Duraikannu

Maruthapillai Ramkumar is an Indian politician and former Member of the Legislative Assembly of Tamil Nadu. He was elected to the Tamil Nadu Legislative Assembly from papanasam constituency.

He contested in the following year's 2001 as a Tamil manila congress candidate, 2006 and 2011 elections as an Indian National Congress candidate. He was the chairman district panchayat (Thanjavur district) from 1996 to 2001.

In 2011 elections he had great chances of getting into the state cabinet (ministry) but due to great disappointment he lost with his rival R. Doraikkannu of the All India Anna Dravida Munnetra Kazhagam.

Where in the elections the All India Anna Dravida Munnetra Kazhagam and their alliance won a drastic seats of 203 pushing out the DMK even from the opposition party.

Even though being the closest associate of late G.K. Moopanar and his son G.K. Vasan there where a lot of speculations of M. Ramkumar rumouring he would turn heads towards the AIADMK.

In June 2016 Mr. Ramkumar joined the All India Anna Dravida Munnetra Kazhagam in the presence of the late Chief Minister J.Jayalalithaa.

== Personal life ==
He was born on 18 April 1968 in Kumbakonam, his parents are Mr.Maruthapillai & Mrs. Jaya Lakshmi, his father Mr. Maruthapillai was a Superintendent of police. He then was graduated from Jamal Mohamed college trichy. Having great interest in politics he joined in the Indian national congress led by Mr. GK.Moopanar.

== Political career ==
After starting his political journey as the staunch loyalist of G. K. Moopanar, The TNCC president from 1976 to 1980, and again in 1988–89. Mr. Moopanar was a puissant AICC general secretary from 1980 to 1988. Moopanar founded the Tamil Maanila Congress in the year 1996 (TMC) party. Moopanar was a Rajya Sabha member when he died. Moopanar also shunned the Prime Minister's post offered to him in April 1997 after the fall of the United Front government led by H.D. Deve Gowda.

In 1991 Mr.Ramkumar was given various positions in the party's youth wing, And later in 1996 contested in the local body elections and held in leading positions in the district panchayat and later he contested and won the Assembly elections representing Papanasam constituency.

He was a close confidente of moopanar's family. Mr.Ramkumar was the chosen candidate for three consecutive terms by G. K. Moopanar in his own home town. Even though being the closest associates of moopanars family Ramkumar decided to join AIADMK, later he was invited by the late Chief Minister of Tamil Nadu Jayalalithaa to join All India Anna Dravida Munnetra Kazhagam.

In June 2016 Mr.Ramkumar joined the All India Anna Dravida Munnetra Kazhagam in the presence of the late Chief Minister J.Jayalalithaa.

Mr.Ramkumar was the barrier opener for most of the leaders of Tamil Maanila Congress to run out of the party and join All India Anna Dravida Munnetra Kazhagam.
