= Papanasam Assembly constituency =

One of the 234 Legislative Assembly Constituencies in Tamil Nadu state, in India

Coordinates: 8.71°N 77.37°E

Papanasam
- Constituency No. 172 for the Tamil Nadu Legislative Assembly

Constituency details
- Country: India
- Region: South India
- State: Tamil Nadu
- District: Thanjavur
- Lok Sabha constituency: Mayiladuthurai
- Established: 1951
- Total electors: 256,617
- Reservation: None

Member of Legislative Assembly
- 17th Tamil Nadu Legislative Assembly
- Incumbent A. M. Shahjahan
- Party: IUML
- Alliance: SSJVA
- Elected year: 2026

Papanasam is a state assembly constituency in Thanjavur district in Tamil Nadu. It is one of the 234 State Legislative Assembly Constituencies in Tamil Nadu, in India.

== Members of Legislative Assembly ==
Year	Member	Political party
Madras State
1952	Swayamprakasam	Independent
1957	G. Venkatachala Nattar	Indian National Congress
1957	R. Subramaniam	Indian National Congress
1962	R. Subramanian	Indian National Congress
1967	R. Soundararaja Moopanar	Indian National Congress
Tamil Nadu
1971	N. Ganapathy	Dravida Munnetra Kazhagam
1977	R. V. Soundararajan	Indian National Congress
1980	S. Rajaraman	Indian National Congress (I)
1984	S. Rajaraman	Indian National Congress
1989	G. Karuppiah Moopanar	Indian National Congress
1991	S. Rajaraman	Indian National Congress
1996	M. Ramkumar	Tamil Maanila Congress
2001	M. Ramkumar	Tamil Maanila Congress
2006	R. Doraikkannu	All India Anna Dravida Munnetra Kazhagam
2011	R. Doraikkannu	All India Anna Dravida Munnetra Kazhagam
2016	R. Doraikkannu	All India Anna Dravida Munnetra Kazhagam
2021	M. H. Jawahirullah (Note: Manithaneya Makkal Katchi candidate won on Dravida Munnetra Kazhagam symbol)	Dravida Munnetra Kazhagam
2026	A. M. Shahjahan	Indian Union Muslim League

== Election results ==
Vote share of winning candidates
2026	33.35%
2021	44.22%
2016	45.26%
2011	53.47%
2006	48.73%
2001	50.37%
1996	56.60%
1991	56.14%
1989	38.89%
1984	58.52%
1980	50.30%
1977	33.40%
1971	56.21%
1967	56.57%
1962	53.42%
1957	29.69%
1952	45.15%

=== 2026 ===
2026 Tamil Nadu Legislative Assembly election: Papanasam
Party	Candidate	Votes	%	±%
IUML	A. M. Shahjahan	69,284	33.35	New
TVK	Azarudeen Uduman Ali	68,219	32.84	New
AIADMK	Dorai Shanmugam Prabhu	57,072	27.48	▼8.42
NTK	Anis Fathima	9,604	4.62	▼2.90
NOTA	None of the above	716	0.34	▼0.27
Margin of victory		1,065	0.51	▼7.80
Turnout		2,07,723	80.95	▲5.81
Registered electors		2,56,617		▼3,921
IUML gain from MNMK		Swing	▲33.35	

=== 2021 ===
2021 Tamil Nadu Legislative Assembly election: Papanasam
Party	Candidate	Votes	%	±%
MNMK	Dr. M. H. Jawahirullah	86,567	44.22%	New
AIADMK	K. Gopinathan	70,294	35.90%	−9.35
AMMK	M. Rengasamy	19,778	10.10%	New
NTK	N. Krishnakumar	14,724	7.52%	+5.4
MNM	K. Shantha	2,032	1.04%	New
NOTA	NOTA	1,204	0.61%	−0.43
Margin of victory		16,273	8.31%	−5.04%
Turnout		195,778	75.14%	−0.80%
Rejected ballots		115	0.06%	
Registered electors		260,538		
MNMK gain from AIADMK		Swing	-1.04%	

=== 2016 ===
2016 Tamil Nadu Legislative Assembly election: Papanasam
Party	Candidate	Votes	%	±%
AIADMK	R. Doraikkannu	82,614	45.26%	−8.21
INC	T. R. Loganathan	58,249	31.91%	−10.32
TMC(M)	S. D. Jayakumar	18,599	10.19%	New
PMK	G. Alayamani	4,963	2.72%	New
NTK	M. I. Humayun Kabir	3,864	2.12%	New
SDPI	A. Mohammed Farook	3,043	1.67%	New
Independent	S. Chandrakasan	2,896	1.59%	New
BJP	Neithalur T. Gunasekaran	2,158	1.18%	+0.19
NOTA	NOTA	1,911	1.05%	New
Independent	S. Jagadeesh Kumar	1,027	0.56%	New
Margin of victory		24,365	13.35%	2.10%
Turnout		182,548	75.95%	−4.86%
Registered electors		240,357		
AIADMK hold		Swing	-8.21%	

=== 2011 ===
2011 Tamil Nadu Legislative Assembly election: Papanasam
Party	Candidate	Votes	%	±%
AIADMK	R. Doraikkannu	85,635	53.47%	+4.74
INC	M. Ramkumar	67,628	42.22%	−0.82
BJP	T. Mahendren	1,596	1.00%	−0.3
Independent	P. A. Mohamed Gani	1,231	0.77%	New
ABHM	K. Samba Vaidyanathan	1,174	0.73%	New
BSP	R. Thirumeni	1,082	0.68%	−0.28
Margin of victory		18,007	11.24%	5.56%
Turnout		160,162	80.81%	4.42%
Registered electors		198,200		
AIADMK hold		Swing	4.74%	

=== 2006 ===
2006 Tamil Nadu Legislative Assembly election: Papanasam
Party	Candidate	Votes	%	±%
AIADMK	R. Doraikkannu	60,027	48.73%	New
INC	M. Ramkumar	53,026	43.05%	New
DMDK	N. Maruthaiyan	4,443	3.61%	New
BJP	R. Vasudevan	1,594	1.29%	New
BSP	R. Sangeetha	1,174	0.95%	New
AIFB	A. M. Mohan	1,145	0.93%	New
Independent	P. Annadurai	897	0.73%	New
SP	A. Durai Burhanudeen	874	0.71%	New
Margin of victory		7,001	5.68%	−0.30%
Turnout		123,180	76.39%	9.10%
Registered electors		161,259		
AIADMK gain from TMC(M)		Swing	-1.64%	

=== 2001 ===
2001 Tamil Nadu Legislative Assembly election: Papanasam
Party	Candidate	Votes	%	±%
TMC(M)	M. Ramkumar	55,830	50.37%	New
DMK	S. Kalyana Sundaram	49,198	44.38%	New
MDMK	N. Sambath	2,480	2.24%	−2.93
Independent	A. Abdullah	1,508	1.36%	New
Independent	R. Senthamarai	1,329	1.20%	New
Margin of victory		6,632	5.98%	−30.95%
Turnout		110,844	67.29%	−4.09%
Registered electors		164,795		
TMC(M) hold		Swing	-6.23%	

=== 1996 ===
1996 Tamil Nadu Legislative Assembly election: Papanasam
Party	Candidate	Votes	%	±%
TMC(M)	N.Karuppana Udayar	58,757	56.60%	New
Independent	R. Thirunavukkarasu	20,415	19.67%	New
PMK	A. M. Mohan	8,326	8.02%	New
MDMK	K. Arumugham	5,367	5.17%	New
Independent	R. Varatharajan	4,595	4.43%	New
Independent	T. M. Mani	4,150	4.00%	New
Independent	N. Palanichamy	806	0.78%	New
Margin of victory		38,342	36.93%	14.33%
Turnout		103,810	71.38%	1.07%
Registered electors		155,985		
TMC(M) gain from INC		Swing	0.46%	

=== 1991 ===
1991 Tamil Nadu Legislative Assembly election: Papanasam
Party	Candidate	Votes	%	±%
INC	S. Rajaraman	54,445	56.14%	+17.25
DMK	S. Kalyana Sundaram	32,520	33.53%	−4.19
PMK	K. Gondindaraju	6,279	6.47%	New
Independent	N. Kalimuthu	1,900	1.96%	New
BJP	R. Sundaramoorthy	1,497	1.54%	New
Margin of victory		21,925	22.61%	21.44%
Turnout		96,987	70.30%	−3.79%
Registered electors		142,902		
INC hold		Swing	17.25%	

=== 1989 ===
1989 Tamil Nadu Legislative Assembly election: Papanasam
Party	Candidate	Votes	%	±%
INC	G. Karuppiah Moopanar	36,278	38.89%	−19.64
DMK	S. Kalyanasundaram	35,186	37.72%	−1.44
AIADMK	A. Raj Mohammed	12,868	13.79%	New
AIADMK	Valampuri John	8,302	8.90%	New
Margin of victory		1,092	1.17%	−18.20%
Turnout		93,290	74.09%	−6.36%
Registered electors		128,105		
INC hold		Swing	-19.64%	

=== 1984 ===
1984 Tamil Nadu Legislative Assembly election: Papanasam
Party	Candidate	Votes	%	±%
INC	S. Rajaraman	52,202	58.52%	+8.22
DMK	S. Sachidhanandam	34,924	39.15%	New
INC(J)	V. S. Palanisami	1,341	1.50%	New
Independent	A. R. Marimuthu	731	0.82%	New
Margin of victory		17,278	19.37%	15.26%
Turnout		89,198	80.45%	12.27%
Registered electors		114,852		
INC hold		Swing	8.22%	

=== 1980 ===
1980 Tamil Nadu Legislative Assembly election: Papanasam
Party	Candidate	Votes	%	±%
INC	S. Rajaraman	36,101	50.30%	+16.9
AIADMK	Govi. Narayanaswamy	33,152	46.19%	New
Independent	R. V. Soundararajan	831	1.16%	New
Independent	D. Nagaraja Moopanar	698	0.97%	New
JP	V. Sakkarai Alias Gnana Prakasam	560	0.78%	New
Margin of victory		2,949	4.11%	1.91%
Turnout		71,766	68.18%	−3.72%
Registered electors		106,374		
INC hold		Swing	16.90%	

=== 1977 ===
1977 Tamil Nadu Legislative Assembly election: Papanasam
Party	Candidate	Votes	%	±%
INC	R. V. Soundararajan	24,904	33.40%	−10.38
DMK	S. Sachidhanandam	23,268	31.21%	−25
Independent	P. K. E. Abdullah	20,714	27.78%	New
JP	T. A. Jayaraman	4,769	6.40%	New
Independent	S. Sevu Panickar	898	1.20%	New
Margin of victory		1,636	2.19%	−10.23%
Turnout		74,553	71.90%	−8.76%
Registered electors		105,384		
INC gain from DMK		Swing	-22.81%	

=== 1971 ===
1971 Tamil Nadu Legislative Assembly election: Papanasam
Party	Candidate	Votes	%	±%
DMK	N. Ganapathy	43,497	56.21%	New
INC	V. Ramakrishnan	33,884	43.79%	−12.78
Margin of victory		9,613	12.42%	−1.60%
Turnout		77,381	80.66%	−1.42%
Registered electors		98,563		
DMK gain from INC		Swing	-0.36%	

=== 1967 ===
1967 Madras Legislative Assembly election: Papanasam
Party	Candidate	Votes	%	±%
INC	R. S. Mooppanar	41,323	56.57%	+3.15
Independent	A. M. Sali	31,077	42.54%	New
Independent	K. J. A. Samath	647	0.89%	New
Margin of victory		10,246	14.03%	7.19%
Turnout		73,047	82.08%	7.86%
Registered electors		92,870		
INC hold		Swing	3.15%	

=== 1962 ===
1962 Madras Legislative Assembly election: Papanasam
Party	Candidate	Votes	%	±%
INC	R. Subramanian	33,144	53.42%	+23.72
DMK	N. Somasundram	28,904	46.58%	New
Margin of victory		4,240	6.83%	1.16%
Turnout		62,048	74.22%	−7.44%
Registered electors		86,481		
INC hold		Swing	23.72%	

=== 1957 ===
1957 Madras Legislative Assembly election: Papanasam
Party	Candidate	Votes	%	±%
INC	Venkitachala Nattar	38,971	29.69%	−10.34%
INC	R. Subramaniam (SC)	31,531	24.02%	−16.01%
Independent	Haritharanathan	17,195	13.10%	
Independent	Tajudeen	11,084	8.44%	
Independent	Sami Ayya Pasumpadiyar	9,364	7.13%	
Independent	Srinivasan Pillli	7,788	5.93%	
Independent	Pattammal (SC)	6,075	4.63%	
Independent	Chandrasekhara Udayar	5,330	4.06%	
Independent	Ayyaru (SC)	3,914	2.98%	
Margin of victory		7,440	5.67%	0.55%
Turnout		1,31,252	81.66%	23.02%
Registered electors		1,60,721		
INC gain from Independent		Swing	-15.46%	

=== 1952 ===
1952 Madras Legislative Assembly election: Papanasam
Party	Candidate	Votes	%	±%
Independent	Swayamprakasam	22,134	45.15%	
INC	Abdul Majeed Sahib	19,625	40.03%	40.03%
Independent	Bhuvaraha Iyengar	4,108	8.38%	
Independent	Panchapakesa Sastri	3,158	6.44%	
Margin of victory		2,509	5.12%	
Turnout		49,025	58.64%	
Registered electors		83,604		
Independent win (new seat)				
