= S. Rajaraman =

Indian politician

S. Rajaraman is an Indian politician and former Member of the Legislative Assembly of Tamil Nadu. He was elected to the Tamil Nadu legislative assembly as an Indian National Congress (Indira) candidate Papanasam constituency in 1980 election, as an Indian National Congress candidate from in 1984, and 1991 elections.
