= Rajagiri, Papanasam =

Rajagiri Rajaghiri
- village
- Interactive map of Rajagiri
- Coordinates: 10.920276°N 79.244594°E
- Country: India
- State: Tamil Nadu
- District: Thanjavur
- Taluk: Papanasam

Government
  - Type: village
  - Body: panchayat

Population (2011)
  - Total: 8,460

Languages
  - Official: Tamil
- Time zone: UTC+5:30 (IST)
- Postal code: 614207
- Vehicle registration: TN68
- Website: www.rajaghiri.com

Rajagiri (also Rajaghiri) is a panchayat village in the Papanasam taluk of Thanjavur district, Tamil Nadu, India.

== Demographics ==
Rajagiri is one of the major villages of Papanasam taluk, Thanjavur dist., Tamil Nadu, India with population of more than 10,000 (as of 2014), but actual census in 2011 was 8,460 (45% male and 55% female). It is situate on the national highway NH-36 (old NH-45C), between Thanjavur and Kumbakonam, 22 km from Thanjavur city and 18 km from Kumbakonam town. Its longitude and latitude was 10.920276, 79.244594 respectively. Its ancient name was Raja Kesari Sathurvethi Mangalam.

Majority of its residents are Muslims. Dalits, Christians, and Hindus are also scattered living in its surroundings. Four big mosques, Ayyanar temple, Christian church are very famous religious identification.

There is a river Kudamurutti helping the farmers to cultivate the good food - grains. The river Thirumalai Rajan is a branch river of Kudamurutti which start from here in Rajagiri. The dam in Rajagiri with these two rivers are helping to farmers for agriculture of Papanasam, Valangaiman, and some area of Thiruvarur and Nagappattinam Taluks.

It is predominantly agriculture based. A sizable population of people took up jobs in Singapore, Malaysia and Brunei. As the opportunities in these countries diminished, educated younger generation opted for lucrative jobs in Arab countries of the Persian Gulf (Dubai, Qatar, Bahrain, Kuwait and Saudi Arabia) and few of them in England and United States of America. Nowadays, most probability every household in the village has at least one person in the Persian Gulf (Middle East Countries).

The railway station, which has two platforms as Pandaravadai is share with Rajagiri. A government hospital is situated in puthu road is share with Rajagiri and Pandaravadai.

The level of education in the village is comparatively high in spite of absence of a high school as late as a decade ago. In order to fill the gap, opted for an English-medium school, which recently blossomed into a higher secondary schools, run by private managements. Beside this, there is a high school, elementary school by private management, a government primary school and exclusive government approved Islamic girl’s higher secondary school with hostel facilities. The recent literacy is identified as 95%.

Its postal pin-code is 614207, village panchayat code is 231745, and the STD code 04374 is share with Papanasam telephone exchange. Additionally, maintenance branch of Papanasam telecom is also running in Rajagiri.

A government library is running near JP Nagar, which is newly formed areas. The Centre of village is called Santhi-Kadu is a major market of its surrounding areas. Beside this, lot of commercial shopping markets (including fancy, textiles, super markets, all building materials, currency exchanges, foreign commodities, medical shops, computer training centers, auto mechanic shops including hiring vehicles) are also very famous even surrounding of this village. Even though it was register as village panchayat, actually look like small town. Consequently, many business persons and employees have transferred from their native to here for their financial growth.

There are two nationalized banks such as Indian overseas bank and Bank of India, are also very famous to trade by executives and residents of its surrounding area. additionally huge shops are running on the main road of Rajagiri.
