= Purasawalkam Srinivasa Perumal Temple =

Temple in Tamil Nadu, India

Religion
- Affiliation: Hinduism
- District: Chennai district
- Festivals: Brahmotsav, Vaikunta Ekadasi

Location
- Location: Purasawalkam
- State: Tamil Nadu
- Country: India
- Interactive map of Purasawalkam Srinivasa Perumal Temple
- Coordinates: 13.081875°N 80.250920°E

Architecture
- Elevation: 33 m (108 ft)

Website
- hrce.tn.gov.in

Srinivasa Perumal Temple is a Perumal Temple situated in Purasawalkam neighbourhood of Chennai district in Tamil Nadu state in the peninsular India.

It is located at an altitude of about 33 m above the mean sea level with the geographical coordinates of 13.081875°N 80.250920°E (i.e., 13°04'54.8"N, 80°15'03.3"E). This temple is under the control of Hindu Religious and Charitable Endowments Department, Government of Tamil Nadu. Kumbabhishek of this temple was performed on 15 September 2017. In April 2019, Lakhsarchana was done in the temple. This temple is one of the heritage buildings, as per the draft list prepared by the CMDA (Chennai Metropolitan Development Authority). Brahmotsav and Vaikunta Ekadasi are some of the important festivals celebrated in this temple.
