= Tamil Nadu Congress Committee =

- President: Manickam Tagore
- Chairman: Tharahai Cuthbert
- Headquarters: Sathyamurthy Bhavan, General Patters road, Chennai-600002, Tamil Nadu
- Youth wing: Tamil Nadu Youth Congress
- Women's wing: Tamil Nadu Mahila Congress Committee
- Ideology: Populism; Social liberalism; Democratic socialism; Social democracy; Secularism
- ECI status: A State Unit of Indian National Congress
- Alliance: SSJVA(State level ) INDIA(National Level)
- Seats in Rajya Sabha: 3 / 18
- Seats in Lok Sabha: 9 / 39
- Seats in Tamil Nadu Legislative Assembly: 5 / 234

Election symbol

Website
- inctamilnadu.in//

Tamil Nadu Congress Committee (TNCC) is the wing of Indian National Congress serving in Tamil Nadu. It is responsible for organizing and coordinating the party's activities and campaigns within the state, as well as selecting candidates for local, state, and national elections. The current president is Manickam Tagore.

Social policy of the TNCC is officially based upon the Gandhian principle of Sarvodaya (upliftment of all sections of the society). In particular TNCC emphasises upon policies to improve the lives of the economically and socially unprivileged sections of society. The party primarily endorses social liberalism (seeks to balance individual liberty and social justice).

== Ideology and policy positions ==
Since the 1950s, the TNCC has favored liberal positions (the term "liberal" in this sense describes modern liberalism, not classical liberalism) with support for social justice and a mixed economy. TNCC strongly supports Liberal nationalism, a kind of nationalism compatible with values of freedom, tolerance, equality, and individual rights.

Historically, the party has favoured farmers, labourers, and the working class; it has opposed unregulated business and finance. In recent decades, the party has adopted a centrist economic and socially progressive agenda and has begun to advocate for more social justice, affirmative action, a balanced budget, and a market economy. The economic policy adopted by the modern TNCC is free market policies, though at the same time it is in favour of taking a cautious approach when it comes to liberalising the economy, claiming it is to help ensure that the weaker sectors are not affected too hard by the changes that come with liberalisation. In the 1990s, however, it endorsed market reforms, including privatisation and the deregulation of the economy. It also has supported secular policies that encourage equal rights for all citizens, including those from the lower stratas. The party supports the somewhat controversial concept of family planning with birth control.

=== Economic policy ===
The Congress strongly endorses a mixed Capital economy in which both the private sector and the state direct the economy, reflecting characteristics of both market economies and planned economies. A leading economic theory advocated by the modern Tamil Nadu Congress party is import substitution industrialisation that advocates replacing foreign imports with domestic production. Party also believes that mixed economies often provide environmental protection, maintenance of employment standards, a standardized welfare system, and maintenance of competition. The Indian National Congress party liberalised the Indian economy, allowing it to speed up development dramatically.

=== Healthcare and education ===
Tamil Nadu Congress Pioneered the first Midday Meal Scheme in India in the Year 1953. This led to a huge wave of enrollment by students from the predominant rural and semi urban pockets of Tamil Nadu, which helped increase the Literacy rate of the state from 16% in 1947 to 82% in 2011. Today, it has become the largest schoolchild feeding programme in the world, covering 110 million students in 1.2 million schools. This rural health initiative was praised by the American economist Jeffrey Sachs and former American President John F. Kennedy. During the TNCC tenure, an IIT and was opened in the state.

=== Security and state affairs ===
The Tamil Nadu Congress party has been instrumental in debating and helping strengthen anti-terror and vigilant laws leading to amendments to the Security Laws of the Tamil Nadu Government Departments. Also, Unique Identification Authority of India was established in February 2009, with the help of the Central Government, an agency responsible for implementing the envisioned Multipurpose National Identity Card with the objective of increasing national security and facilitating e-governance.

== Structure and composition ==
S.no	Name	Designation
1.	Ghulam Ahmad Mir	AICC Incharge
2.	Suraj N Hegde	AICC Secretary
3.	Manickam Tagore	President; Tamil Nadu Congress Committee
4.	Ruby R. Manoharan	Treasurer; Tamil Nadu Congress Committee
5.	Tharahai Cuthbert	CLP Leader; Tamil Nadu Legislative Assembly

== List of presidents ==
S.no	President	Portrait	Term	
1.	C. Rajagopalachari		1931	1935
2.	S. Satyamurti		May 1935	December 1936
3.	C. N. Muthuranga Mudaliar		6 December 1936	January 1939
4.	O. P. Ramaswamy Reddiyar		January 1939	February 1940
5.	K. Kamaraj		15 February 1940	1952
6.	P. Subbarayan		1952	1952
(5).	K. Kamaraj		1952	April 1954
7.	K. Sattanatha Karayalar		April 1954	December 1954
8.	P. Kakkan		December 1954	1957
9.	K. Rajaram Naidu		1957	1960
10.	O. V. Alagesan		1960	1962
11.	R. Krishnasamy Naidu		1962	1967
12.	Chidambaram Subramaniam		December 1967	December 1969
13.	R. V. Swaminathan Cong(I)		December 1969	February 1976
(8).	P. Kakkan Cong(O)		December 1969	December 1972
14.	P. Ramachandran Cong(O)		December 1972	March 1977
15.	G.K. Moopanar		February 1976	March 1979
16.	L. Elayaperumal		March 1979	1980
17.	M. P. Subramaniam		1980	September 1982
18.	Maragatham Chandrasekar		September 1982	May 1983
19.	M. Palaniyandi		May 1983	1988
(15).	G.K. Moopanar		1988	1989
20.	Vazhappady K. Ramamurthy		May 1989	January 1995
21.	Kumari Anandan		January 1995	March 1997
22.	K. V. Thangkabalu		March 1997	July 1998
23.	Tindivanam K. Ramamurthy		July 1998	June 2000
24.	E. V. K. S. Elangovan		June 2000	Sep 2002
25.	So. Balakrishnan		Sep 2002	Nov 2003
26.	G. K. Vasan		Nov 2003	Feb 2006
27.	M. Krishnasamy		Feb 2006	July 2008
(22).	K. V. Thangkabalu		July 2008	November 2011
28.	B. S. Gnanadesikan		November 2011	October 2014
(24).	E. V. K. S. Elangovan		Nov 2014	Sep 2016
25.	Su. Thirunavukkarasar		Sep 2016	Feb 2019
26.	K. S. Alagiri		Feb 2019	Feb 2024
27.	K. Selvaperunthagai		Feb 2024	June 2026
28.	Manickam Tagore		June 2026	Incumbent

== List of chief ministers of Tamil Nadu from the Congress Party ==
=== Madras Presidency ===
Name	Portrait	Took office	Left office
C. Rajagopalachari		14 July 1937	29 October 1939
T. Prakasam		30 April 1946	23 March 1947
O. P. Ramaswamy Reddiyar		23 March 1947	6 April 1949
P. S. Kumaraswamy Raja		6 April 1949	26 January 1950

=== Madras State ===
Name	Portrait	Took office	Left office
P. S. Kumaraswamy Raja		27 January 1950	9 April 1952
C. Rajagopalachari		10 April 1952	13 April 1954
K. Kamaraj		13 April 1954	2 October 1963
M. Bhakthavatsalam		2 October 1963	28 February 1967

== Tamil Nadu Legislative Assembly elections ==
Year	Party leader	Votes polled	Seats won	Change in seats	Outcome
Madras Presidency
1937	C. Rajagopalachari		159 / 215	New	Government
1946	Tanguturi Prakasam		163 / 215	▲4	Government
Madras State
1952	C. Rajagopalachari	6,988,701	152 / 375	New	Government
Madras State (Tamil Nadu)
1957	K. Kamaraj	5,046,576	151 / 205	New	Government
1962	K. Kamaraj	5,848,974	139 / 206	▼12	Government
1967	M. Bhakthavatsalam	6,293,378	51 / 234	▼88	Opposition
Tamil Nadu
1971	P. Kakkan Congress (O)	5,513,894	15 / 234	▼36	Opposition (INC+)
1977	G. K. Moopanar	2,994,535	27 / 234	▲12	Opposition (INC+)
1980	M. P. Subramaniam	3,941,900	31 / 234	▲4	Opposition (DMK INC+)
1984	M. Palaniyandi	3,529,708	61 / 234	▲30	Government (AIADMK INC+)
1989	G. K. Moopanar	4,780,714	26 / 234	▼35	Opposition (INC+)
1991	Vazhappady K. Ramamurthy	3,743,859	60 / 234	▲34	Government (AIADMK INC+)
1996	Kumari Anandan	1,523,340	0 / 234	▼60	Opposition (AIADMK INC+)
2001	E. V. K. S. Elangovan	696,205	30 / 234	▲30	Government (AIADMK INC+)
2006	M. Krishnasamy	2,765,768	34 / 234	▲4	Government (DPA)
2011	K. V. Thangkabalu	3,426,432	5 / 234	▼29	Opposition (DMK INC+)
2016	E. V. K. S. Elangovan	2,774,075	8 / 234	▲3	Opposition (DMK INC+)
2021	K. S. Alagiri	1,976,527	18 / 234	▲10	Government (SPA)
2026	K. Selvaperunthagai	1,66,1312	5 / 234	▼13	Government (TVK+)

• Madras State was completely reorganized into the present state of Tamil Nadu in the year 1956. But the name was changed to Tamil Nadu only in the year 1969

Tamil Nadu Congress Legislative Assembly seat count

== Lok Sabha elections (M.P in Tamilnadu) ==
Lok Sabha Elections
Year	Lok Sabha	Seats contested	Seats won	(+/-) in seats	% of votes	Vote swing	Popular vote	Outcome
1951	1st	75	35 / 75	New entry	36.39%	New entry	72,53,452	Government
1957	2nd	41	31 / 41	▼4	46.52%	▲10.13	50,94,552	Government
1962	3rd	41	31 / 41	Steady	45.26%	▼1.26	56,23,013	Government
1967	4th	39	3 / 39	▼28	41.69%	▼3.57	64,36,710	Government
1971	5th	9	9 / 39	▲6	12.51%	▼29.18	19,95,567	Government
1977	6th	15	14 / 39	▲5	22.27%	▲9.76	39,77,306	Opposition
1980	7th	22	20 / 39	▲6	31.62%	▲9.35	58,21,411	Government
1984	8th	26	25 / 39	▲5	40.51%	▲8.89	87,55,871	Government
1989	9th	28	27 / 39	▲2	39.86%	▼0.65	1,05,24,027	Opposition
1991	10th	28	28 / 39	▲1	42.57%	▲2.71	1,05,10,569	Government
1996	11th	29	0 / 39	▼28	18.26%	▼24.31	49,65,364	Opposition
1998	12th	35	0 / 39	Steady	4.78%	▼13.48	12,23,102	Opposition
1999	13th	11	2 / 39	▲2	11.10%	▲6.32	30,22,107	Opposition
2004	14th	10	10 / 39	▲8	14.40%	▲3.30	41,34,255	Government
2009	15th	15	8 / 39	▼2	15.03%	▲0.63	45,67,779	Government
2014	16th	39	0 / 39	▼8	4.37%	▼10.66	17,50,990	Opposition
2019	17th	9	8 / 39	▲8	12.72%	▲8.35	54,05,674	Opposition
2024	18th	9	9 / 39	▲1	10.67%	▼2.05	46,32,770	Opposition

Tamil Nadu Congress Lok Sabha seat count

== See also ==
- Congress Working Committee
- All India Congress Committee (AICC)
- Pradesh Congress Committee
- Indian Youth Congress
- All India Mahila Congress
- National Students Union of India
