= Srinivasa Perumal Temple, Papanasam =

Hindu temple

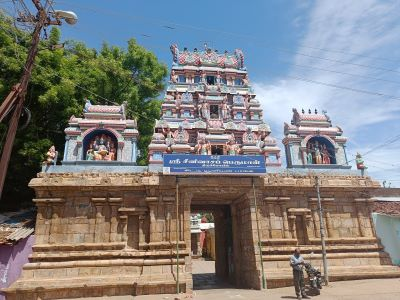
Entrance

The Srinivasa Perumal Temple in Papanasam, Thanjavur district, Tamil Nadu, India is a Hindu temple dedicated to Vishnu.

It has three tier gopura facing east. The temple has two prakaras. Near the temple is a temple tank. The main deity is Srinivasa Perumal.

The Kumbhabhishekham (consecration) was held in 2017.
