= G. K. Vasan =

Indian politician

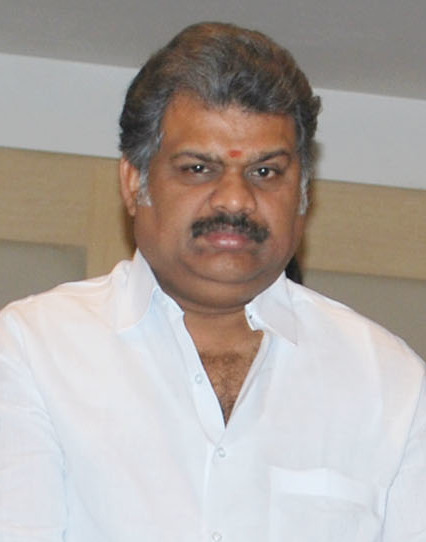

President, Tamil Maanila Congress (M)
- Incumbent
- Assumed office 3 November 2014

Union Minister of Shipping
- In office 28 May 2009 – 26 May 2014
- Prime Minister: Manmohan Singh
- Preceded by: T. R. Baalu
- Succeeded by: Nitin Gadkari

Minister of State (Independent Charge) of the Ministry of Statistics & Programme Implementation
- In office 29 Jan 2006 – 22 May 2009
- Prime Minister: Manmohan Singh
- Succeeded by: Sriprakash Jaiswal

Member, Consultative Committee for the Ministry of Urban Development and Committee on Coal and Steel
- In office 2004–2006

Member of Parliament, Rajya Sabha
- In office 3 April 2020 – 2 April 2026
- Succeeded by: Anbumani Ramadoss
- In office 2 April 2002 – 2 April 2014

President, TNCC
- In office 2003 - 2006
- Preceded by: E. V. K. S. Elangovan
- Succeeded by: M. Krishnasamy

Personal details
- Born: Govindaswamy Karuppiah Vasan; 28 December 1964 (age 61) Sundara Perumalkoil, Tamil Nadu, India
- Party: Tamil Maanila Congress (M) (From 2001-2002; From 2014-Till date)
- Other political affiliations: Indian National Congress (From 2002 - 2014)
- Spouse: Sunitha Vasan
- Children: G.K.V Pranav
- Parent: G. K. Moopanar Kasthuri Moopanar
- Education: The New College, Madras University
- Profession: Farmer, Politician

G. K. Vasan (born Govindaswamy Karuppiah Vasan, 28 December 1964) is an Indian politician and son of G. K. Moopanar, a veteran Indian National Congress leader. G. K. Vasan is currently the president of Tamil Maanila Congress (M), a political party in the state of Tamil Nadu, India. He was a member of Rajya Sabha, the upper house of Indian Parliament from 2002 until 2014. During his tenure as a Member of Indian Parliament, he had functioned in several positions in the Union Government under UPA 1 & UPA II regime including as a Minister of State (Independent Charge) for Ministry of Statistics & Programme Implementation from Jan. 2006 – May 2009; Union Minister of Shipping from May 2009 – May 2014 and as an In-charge Minister for Labour from January 2014 - April 2014.

== Family and education ==
Govindaswamy Karuppiah Vasan, better known as G. K. Vasan was born on 28 December 1964 in Sundara Perumal Koil, Thanjavur District in Tamil Nadu to an affluent agricultural landlord family to G. K. Moopanar and Kasthuri Moopanar. G. K Moopanar was a secular statesman committed to nation building. Ever since the country's first general election to Indian parliament, he had played a major key role in socio-political undertakings in the Indian National Congress. His forefathers were landlords. In fact, during the pre-Independence period, all of Thanjavur comprising merely five provinces, and his family clan was one of the few who ruled over the richest arable land in the region Kabisthalam. It was also called as Moopanar. G.K. Vasan did his schooling from Madras Christian College Higher Secondary School in Chennai and completed his graduation in Bachelor of Arts (B.A.) Corporate Secretaryship from The New College, Madras University, Chennai, Tamil Nadu. He is married to Shrimathi Sunitha Vasan, daughter of Dr. N. Lakshmi Narayanan, a Professor of Medicine and Shrimathi Sulochana. Shrimathi Sunitha Vasan has university gold medal grades in both her (M.A) academic programmes. She has completed Master of Arts (M.A.) in Psychology, from SIET College; Madras University and Master of Arts (M.A.) in Sociology, from Pondicherry University. She is a qualified counselor, both in academics and personal and is actively involved in developing academic curriculum for special children. They have a son, Shri G.K. Pranav.

== Political career ==
In the initial phase of political career, G. K. Vasan though was not officially a chair in the party, yet actively involved in the political events in Thanjavur district, Tamil Nadu. He was supportive of G. K. Moopanar in his political administrations and did participate in election campaigns in Mayiladuthurai Parliament Constituency and Papanasam State Assembly Constituency. After the demise of G. K. Moopanar in 2001, G. K. Vasan was unanimously elected as the President of Tamil Maanila Congress by the MPs, MLAs and senior functionaries of the party.

G. K. Vasan was then the youngest president of a State Political Party in India. Under his leadership, the party fielded 32 candidates in the 12th Tamil Nadu State Assembly election and won 23 constituencies by securing over 18.85 Lakhs votes.

In the year 2002, when the party (TMC) was most influential and strong both in organizational strength and political representation at state and centre; G. K. Vasan came forward to fulfill the wishes of G. K. Moopanar and millions of his party followers. On 14 August 2001, the party (TMC) under the leadership of G. K. Vasan and its MPs, MLAs and millions of cadres got merged unconditionally with the Indian National Congress.

After becoming a member in Indian National Congress, G. K. Vasan played major roles at both National and State Level politics. He became a Secretary (in 2002) of All India Congress Committee and rose to the level of becoming the youngest President of Tamil Nadu Congress Committee in 2004; making him only next to Perunthalaivar K. Kamarajar who held the honour of being the youngest President of Tamil Nadu Congress Committee.

G. K. Vasan extensively toured the state to rejuvenate the party cadres and interacted with general public to strengthen the organisation. In his maiden election (13th Tamil Nadu State Assembly Election) as a President of Tamil Nadu Congress Committee; in an alliance with DMK, fielded 10 candidates and won all of them.

An act of recognition of his performance in state politics; Indian National Congress Committee elevated G. K. Vasan to become a Member of Rajya Sabha, an upper house of Indian Parliament in the year 2002.

G. K. Vasan was also privileged to be the youngest President of Tamil Nadu Congress Committee; making him until today, the only person next to Perunthalaivar K. Kamarajar who held the honour of being the youngest President of Tamil Nadu Congress Committee.

== Elected to Rajya Sabha, Member of Parliament 2002–2014 ==
G. K. Vasan was elected from the state of Tamil Nadu to Indian Parliament in the year 2002. As a Member of Parliament, he was part of several administrative consultative committees on policies and programme implementations. As a rural resident himself, he constantly strives to empower the local bodies and in the process, he was keenly associated as a member of:

Consultative committee for the Ministry of Agriculture (years 2002–2004): whereby, dynamically backed the measures to build a vibrant rural economy and for National Food Security.

Departmentally-Related Standing Committee on Urban and Rural Development (year 2003–2004).

Committee on Urban and Rural Development (year 2003–2004).

Member, Committee on Subordinate Legislation (year 2003–2004).

Member, Committee on Coal and Steel (years 2004–2006).

Member, Consultative Committee for the Ministry of Urban Development (years 2004–2006).

Actively involved in the parliamentary bill 'The Provisions of the Municipalities (Ext.to the Scheduled Areas)'; a setup of urban local bodies in the scheduled areas.

== Union Minister of Shipping ==
G. K. Vasan was sworn in as Union Minister of Shipping under the leadership of Dr. Manmohan Singh, the 13th Prime Minister of India. The Shipping Ministry under his able guidance saw a stupendous growth both in infrastructure and economic performance. The industry registered several landmark achievements during his tenure and claimed India would be the next hub for ship building industry.

G. K. Vasan was one of the very few cabinet ministers in UPA II, who continued to function in the same portfolio for the entire 5 years terms.

The following are the major achievements during his tenure.

Achievements:

The first assignment initiated was to 'Reform and Modernize' the operations of shipping industry by introducing 'e- auction tendering system', implementing revised 'auction rate for lease of lands which belong to Indian Ports and introduced 'revival strategy for 133 nos of non-functional ports and revised the 'auction rate for the land lease'.

The shipping ministry under G. K. Vasan leadership; awarded about 88 new projects with an investment of INR 42,953 Crore to enhance the marine infrastructure in his country and successfully concluded the ministerial term with a virtue of 'Impressive performance with high integrity, simplicity and transparency'. The Ministry of Shipping was the only office then, to have a sector specific 'Land Policy Guidelines' approved by the Cabinet; a step towards 'Transparency and Accountability'. The Shipping Ministry (Cochin Shipyard (CSL) in Kochi, Kerala) 'designed and build an Indigenous Aircraft Carrier, INS Vikrant for the Indian Navy'; making India, only the 5th country, next to US, the UK, Russia and France to hold an independent capability.

The Shipping Corporation of India (SCI) a PSU under the Ministry of Shipping, saw a significant growth making then Finance Minister, Mr. Pranab Mukherjee expressing hope (in 2010) that the SCI, which is a Navratna company, would certainly attain Maharatna status much sooner.

Averted the biggest thread in maritime world 'The nationwide hunger strike by port workers in 2010' by bringing an amicable acceptance between union federations and port administration. Thus it ensured an uninterrupted cargo trade of 580 million tons and brought happiness to 60,000 port workers.

It was purely on his personnel interest; he intervened to hold 12 rounds of meetings with the labour unions and brought a solution to their long pending desires. To his credit; thereof never have been labour strikes in the shipping industry during his entire cabinet tenure.

Launched the vision document 'Maritime Agenda 2020' a road map to build a 3200 million tonnes per year of port capacity by infusing an estimated investment of Rs. 3 lakh crore by 2020 to position India as a global hub for marine industry. Honored the legacy of freedom fighters (Perunthalaivar K. Kamarajar and V.O Chidambaranar Pillai) by re-titling the ‘Ennore Port’ as 'Kamarajar Port' and ‘Tuticorin Port’ as ‘V.O. Chidambaranar Port’. It is only next to Pandit. Jawaharlal Nehru, a leader name is titled for ports in India. Achieved 2 greatest milestones (in 2011) in the annals of Indian Maritime History:

1. Indian shipping tonnage crossed the 10 million mark with a target set to achieve 43 million Gross Tonnage by 2020.
2. The aggregate cargo handling capacity across all ports in India, crossed '1 billion Tons'.

Laid the foundation stone (in 2013) for India's largest container handling terminal at Jawaharlal Nehru Port Trust (JNPT), Mumbai; thus positioning JNPT at rank 26th among the top 100 container ports in the world.

The V.O Chidambaranar Port (Tuticorin) saw an amazing growth: Infrastructure projects worth Rs. 27,841 crore were infused to handle a massive volume of trade (413 million tons) and positioned the port as 10th largest port in India.

The Kamarajar Port (Chennai) realized a tremendous growth both in economic performance and Infrastructure development: It achieved a 2 fold growth rate of 30 MTPA in 2014 to become the '12th largest port in India'.

As part of revamp programme; augmented the infrastructure facilities at 'Port Blair' and positioned it as '13th Major Port in India'. Launched the passenger ferry service between Tuticorin & Colombo to realize the dream of freedom fighter V. O. Chidambaram Pillai. An initiative after 100 years of such maiden service launched by V.O Chidambaram Pillai in 1907. Inaugurated 'First International Seafarers Day' (in 2011) marking the importance of safety, welfare & security of seafarers and honored the Indian seafarers for their immense contribution to world economic trade.

Raised the piracy issue at international forums (UN security Council and IMO) and proposed an 'Unified UN Security Force' to combat piracy, secure men and safely deliver more than 90% of world's goods trade.

The ministry was more considerate to open a thought for granting IT exemption, tax concessions and pension benefits to Indian seafarers; a candid initiative where whole of shipping fraternity remembers him, even today. Women Empowerment: G. K. Vasan always believed women are an integral part of our growth and hence voiced for larger recruitment of Women as Seafarers in Marine Industry.

MoS (Independent Charge) Statistics & Programme Implementation (January 2006 – May 2009)

G. K. Vasan was first inducted in the Union Cabinet under the leadership of Dr. Manmohan Sign, the 13th Prime Minister of India. He was sworn in as MoS (Independent Charge) for Statistics & Programme Implementation. The ministry under the able guidance of G. K. Vasan realized several accomplishments that added value to enhance the performance of other Union Ministries.

The following are the major few achievements during his tenure:

Achievements:

Enacted the Collection of Statistics Act, 2008 which replaced the Collection of Statistics Act, 1953 to significantly empower the data collection mechanism at all levels of government.

First ever comprehensive cadre review (Human Resource Development) in the statistical department was successfully completed by upgrading 127 Directors (NFSG) level posts to SAG (Joint Secretary) level and newly introducing subordinate Group B and Group C level officer positions in the Indian Statistical Service.

G. K. Vasan had urged all the state governments to induct a 'Statistical Commission' and a separate 'Department of Statistics' to strengthen the statistical system in India.

Released the 'First Millennium Development Goals India Country Report: A set of 8 goals primarily linked to participatory governance for overall Rural Development.

A Twenty Point Programme as part of Social Justice was restructured with inclusion of new schemes like 'National Employment Guarantee Act (NREGA), Rural Business Hubs, Local Self Government both in urban local bodies and panchayat raj, Prevention of child labor, HIV/AIDS, Mid day Meal, etc.

Established 'National Academy of Statistical Administration' to bring out the best statistical minds from India on par with international standard.

Birth Anniversary (29 June) of Prof. P C Mahalanobis was declared as the 'National Statistical Day' to honour his contributions in the field of Statistics and Economic Planning. With concerted efforts, enhanced the Member of Parliament Local Area Development Scheme (MPLADS) fund from INR 2 crore to INR 5 crore and issued a comprehensive guidelines on scheme concept, implementation and monitoring.

Software was set up to monitor and enable online access to MPLADS works, which ensured improved transparency and e-governance.

Newly initiated the 'Physical Monitoring System' of MPLADS works through NABARD consultancy services; this enabled an improved performance in the work execution whereby an efficiency enhancement was achieved from 80.14% in March 2004 to 90.01% in the succeeding year.

Due to efficient monitoring, project control and implementation; the ministry ensured an efficient rate of project completion in India: The administration successfully achieved the performance index by reducing the project cost over run from 62% in March 1991 to an impressive rate of 15.5% in September 2006.

The operationalization of the 'National Statistical Commission' was an important initiative to bring about quality and transparency in official statistics. It serves as a key recommendation provider on latest statistical standards and policy initiatives in India.

Political Office

- President, Tamil Maanila Congress (M): from Aug. 2001 – Aug. 2002 and Incumbent from May 2014.
- Secretary, All India Congress Committee (AICC): from Aug. 2002 – Nov. 2003.
- President, Tamil Nadu Congress Committee: from Nov. 2003 – Feb. 2006.
- MoS (Independent Charge) for the Ministry of Statistics & Programme Implementation: from Jan. 2006 – May 2009.
- Union Minister of Shipping: from May 2009 – May 2014.
- In-charge Minister for Labour: from Jan. 2014 – May 2014.

Cultural / Recreation / Club

G. K. Vasan is passionate about Carnatic Music and enjoys playing Cricket and Table Tennis. He does hold positions as:

- Chairman of Board of Trustees: Thiruvaiyaru Thyagabrahma Mahotsava Sabha.
- Life Member: Tamil Nadu Cricket Association.
- Life Member: Cosmopolitan Club, Chennai.
- Life Member: Constitution Club, New Delhi.

=== Other Interests ===
G. K. Vasan is an avid admirer of Carnatic music, happened to develop out of natural bonding between Cauvery and Carnatic music. He is currently the chairman of board of Trustees for 'Thiruvaiyaru Thyagabrahma Mahotsava Sabha' which sponsors an 'Annual Aradhana Festival of Thyagaraja', a tribute to saint composer Sri Thyagaraja Swamy.

He shows greatest interest in the activities of Sabha like his father G. K. Moopanar whose period as a president of 'Thiruvaiyaru Thyagabrahma Mahotsava Sabha' achieved the greatest milestone in making the programme, as an all India and International festival, including then President of India presiding over the function.

Music is a holy concert to God and a great instrument of National integration. Playing Nagaswaram and Thavil are 'Mangala Isai' means auspicious Music for all occasions.

== Rajya Sabha Elections ==
Position	Party	Constituency	From	To	Tenure
Member of Parliament, Rajya Sabha (1st Term)	INC	Tamil Nadu	3 April 2002	2 April 2008	5 years, 365 days
Member of Parliament, Rajya Sabha (2nd Term)	INC	Tamil Nadu	3 April 2008	2 April 2014	5 years, 364 days
Member of Parliament, Rajya Sabha (3rd Term)	TMC(M)	Tamil Nadu	3 April 2020	2 April 2026	5 years, 364 days
