= Srinivasa Perumal Temple, Egmore =

Hindu temple in Chennai

Religion
- Affiliation: Hinduism
- District: Chennai district
- Festivals: Brahmotsav, Vaikunta Ekadasi, Pavithrotsav, Tamil New year day

Location
- Location: Egmore
- State: Tamil Nadu
- Country: India
- Interactive map of Srinivasa Perumal Temple, Egmore
- Coordinates: 13.075505°N 80.254582°E

Architecture
- Elevation: 33 m (108 ft)

Website
- hrce.tn.gov.in

Srinivasa Perumal Temple, Egmore which is maintained under the control of Hindu Religious and Charitable Endowments Department, Government of Tamil Nadu, is a Perumal temple situated in Egmore neighbourhood in Chennai district of Tamil Nadu in India. It was previously called as Lakshmi Narayana Perumal Temple and hence the name Lakshmi Narayana Perumal street, where the temple is located. This temple is 600 years old. The presiding deity is Srinivasa Perumal. Goddess is Padmavathi. 'Vimanam' above the sanctum is said as 'Anantha Vimanam'. The temple tower is of 3 tiers. Balipeedam, Dwajasthambam and Garudaazhwaar shrine are found facing the sanctum. The main deity is in the standing posture. Upper hand on the right side holds the Chakra, and on the left side, the sangu is held and on the lower hand at left side shows 'kati hasta' (rests on hip) and right side shows 'abhaya mudra'. Sages such as Visvamithra, Gowthama and Sthuthi worshipped this temple.

== Location ==
Located at an altitude of 33 m above the mean sea level, the geographical coordinates of this temple are: 13°04'31.8"N, 80°15'16.5"E (i.e. 13.075505°N, 80.254582°E).

== Commercial complex ==
On Poonamallee High road, on the land of about 42,000 sq.ft., near Kilpauk Medical College metro station, where the land belonging to this temple, a commercial complex, would be constructed to ensure a steady income for the temple. At a cost of ₹50 crore, the commercial complex would be set up.
