= Members of Parliament Local Area Development Scheme =

Indian Government local development plan

Members of Parliament Local Area Development Scheme (MPLADS)
- Country: India
- Launched: 23 December 1993; 32 years ago

Members of Parliament Local Area Development Scheme (MPLADS) is a scheme formulated by Government of India on 23 December 1993 that enables the members of parliaments (MP) to recommend developmental work in their constituencies with an emphasis on creating durable community assets based on locally felt needs.

Initially, this scheme was administered by Ministry of Rural Development. Later, in October 1994, Ministry of Statistics and Programme Implementation (MOSPI) has been looking into its working. Elected Members of Rajya Sabha representing the whole of the State as they do, may select works for implementation in one or more district(s) as they may choose. Nominated Members of the Lok Sabha and Rajya Sabha may also select works for implementation in one or more districts, anywhere in the country. MPs can also recommend work of up to Rs. 25 lakhs per year outside their constituency or state of election to promote national unity, harmony and fraternity. MPs can recommend work of up to 25 lakh for Natural Calamity in the state and up to Rs. 1 crore in the country in case of Calamity of Severe Nature (e.g. Tsunami, major cyclones and earthquakes). A State level nodal department is chosen, which is responsible for supervision and monitoring and maintaining coordination with line departments. District authorities (DAs) sanction the work recommended by MPs;District Authority would be responsible for overall coordination and supervision of the works under the scheme at the district level and inspect at least 10% of the works under implementation every year. The District Authority should involve the MPs in the inspections of projects to the extent feasible. sanction funds; identify implementation agency and user agency, implement the work on ground, transfer assets to user agency, and report back to ministry about status of MPLADS in the district.

Each MP is allocated Rs. 5 crore per year since 2011-12 which has been increased from Rs. 5 lakh in 1993-94 and Rs. 2 crore in 1998–99. MoSPI disburses funds to district authorities, not directly to MPs. This annual entitlement is released conditionally in two installments of Rs. 2.5 crore each. Funds are non-lapsable in nature i.e. in case of non-release of fund in a particular year it is carried forward to the next year. MPs need to recommend work worth at least 15% and 7.5% of their funds to create assets in areas inhabited by Scheduled Castes (SCs) and Scheduled Tribes (STs) respectively. Funds for MPLADS can be converged with Mahatma Gandhi National Rural Employment Guarantee Scheme (MGNREGS) for creating more durable assets and with National Program for Development of Sports (Khelo India).

Infrastructure development on land belonging to registered societies/ trusts is permissible, provided the society/trust is engaged in social welfare activity, and is in existence for three years. No more than Rs. 50 lakh for one or more works in the lifetime of the society/trust can be spent. MPLADS funding is not permissible for those societies where the concerned MP and his/ her family members are office bearers. For societies or charitable homes which look after deprived segments of the society, the relaxed grant is Rs. 1 crore.

"As on 2nd July 2018, 47572.75 crores have been released by G.O.I. since 1993 of which 94.99% have been utilized under the scheme. Presently 3,940 crores are disbursed annually for MPLADS scheme.".

Top-5 states with highest utilisation-to-released fund ratio are Telangana (101.42%), Sikkim (100.89%), Chhattisgarh (99.6%), Kerala (99.3%) and West Bengal (98.65%). The Bottom-5 states are Uttarakhand (87.22%), Tripura (88.46%), Jharkhand (88.93%), Rajasthan (90.16%) and Odisha (90.54%). Top Union Territories (UT) with highest utilisation-to -released fund ratio are Lakshadweep (111.68%), Andaman & Nicobar Islands (105.68%) and Delhi (104.1%).

For the year 2017–2018, majority spending of MPLADS funds happened in two sectors: ‘railways, roads, pathways and bridges’ (43%) and ‘Other public activities’ (23%). Education, health, water and sanitation sectors received less funding.

== Type of recommended work ==
Works which will serve greater public purpose and not purpose of few individuals need to be recommended. MPs can only recommend, but District Authorities have the ultimate power to sanction it.

- Key priority sectors : Drinking water facility, education, electricity facility, non-conventional energy resources, healthcare and sanitation, irrigation facilities, railways, roads, pathways and bridges, sports, agriculture and allied activities, self-help group development, urban development.
- Works not permitted: construction of office and residential buildings for public and private agencies, land acquisition or paying compensation, naming assets after individuals, grants or loans to state/central relief fund, assets for individual benefits, works on lands belonging to religious groups, execution of works in unauthorized colonies.
- Other works permitted: construction of railway halt station, providing CCTV camera in strategic locations, installation of bio-digesters at stations, schools, hospitals, provision for fixed weighing scale machines for farmers, installation of rainwater harvesting systems in public spaces, construction of shelters for skill development.

Since start there have been reports of malpractices in running the scheme and there have been demands to scrap it. In 2006, a scandal was exposed by a TV Channel, that showed MPs taking bribe for handing over project work under the MPLADS. A seven - member committee was set up to probe the matter.

Some new guidelines for MPLADS were announced by MOSPI :-

1. Projects implemented by government agencies would now be provided 75 per cent of the project cost as the first instalment, while those implemented by non-governmental agencies would be provided 60 per cent.
2. For smaller projects costing less than ₹2 lakh (US$2,100), the entire amount would be released at one go.
3. No project costing less than ₹1 lakh (US$1,000) would be sanctioned with exception in the case of essential projects, such as installation of hand pumps, and purchase of computers and their accessories, solar electric lamps, chaupals and equipments .
4. The basket of works that could be taken up under the scheme had been widened to include projects such as the purchase of books for libraries, and ambulances and hearse vans that would be owned and controlled by district authorities.
5. The purchase of Microsoft Office software along with the training of two teachers per school would be now allowed as part of an effort to promote computer literacy in the country.

Guidelines are given to maintain transparency of work done: 1. A plaque should be permanently erected at the work place mentioning MP's name, year, cost involved etc. 2. List of complete and ongoing works under MPLADS should be displayed at District Authority office and MPLADS website (www.mplads.gov.in). 3. Citizens can file RTI to know about the status of funds and work. 4. Funds utilised should be audited by chartered accountants, local fund auditors, or any statutory auditors as per state/UT Govt. procedure. 5. Review meetings should be held by MoSPI in states and centre regarding fund utilization under MPLADS scheme. 6. Respective district authorities should also review work implementation with the implementation agency every month, or at least once in a quarter.

== One MP – One Idea ==
The Ministry of Statistics and Programme Implementation has announced a new scheme "One MP – One Idea" under the Member of Parliament Local Area Development Scheme (MPLADS). Based on the innovative ideas received from the local people regarding developmental projects, a ‘One MP – One Idea’ Competition may be held in each Lok Sabha constituency annually to select the three best innovations for cash awards on the specific request of an MP to promote such a scheme in his/her constituency. This competition, launched at constituency level annually, selects the best models for education, skill-building, energy and environment, housing, etc. Individuals, groups, NGOs, industry, and academia can take part in this competition.15% money spend SC community areas and 7.5% fund spend ST community areas.

== Issues with MPLADS ==
=== Optimum citizen participation ===
MPLADS is projected as having the character of decentralized development founded on the principle of participatory development, but there is no indicator available to measure the level of participation. While the website features details on fund utilisation and status of recommended works, the question of participation remains in dark. There is also no indication how ‘locally felt needs’ were ascertained. Comptroller and Auditor General (CAG) of India— a body which audits the receipts and expenditures of the central and state governments, and bodies funded by them—observed in its 2010 report that participation of various constituents in a MP's constituency such as residence forum or local NGOs were ignored to understand local needs.

=== MPLADS as political mileage for elections ===
A study published in 2017 show that during 15th Lok Sabha term (2009–2014) MPs, irrespective of party ideology, spent less in the beginning of the term. Majority of the unspent balance and new funds were spent in the last year of the term. Clearly, MPs are using MPLADS as political mileage to be gained during elections. Yearly expenditure, % utilisation of funds over sanctioned and % completed work over sanctioned increases during the last year of the Lok Sabha term. Non-lapsable funds also catalyse this behaviour.

=== Insufficient monitoring of sanctioned works ===
There is a guideline that district authorities should monitor the sanctioned works, but there is no measurable indicator specified for monitoring. Monitoring activities are also not mentioned in the annual reports. There is no indication of monitoring of asset condition after immediate completion of work and after asset utilization for stipulated time. Implementation agencies should handover utilization certificate to the district authorities. However CAG (2010) found that many implementation agencies did not submit utilisation certificates.

== CAG report on MPLADS ==
The Comptroller and Auditor General of India (CAG) conducted a performance audit of 128 District Authorities of 35 states/ UTs for the period 2004–05 to 2008-09 and published a report in 2010. They observed: Flouting of rules and corruption

- Cases of faulty sanction of works were found where DAs sanctioned work without recommendation from MPs, or at a higher cost than estimated.

- In almost 100 districts, funds were utilised to create non-permissible assets such as office buildings for Govt. or private entities, works for religious institutions, etc.
- In 10 states, costs sanctioned for Registered Societies/ Trusts exceeded the ceiling of Rs. 25 lakhs.
- In 9 states/UTs, MPs directly recommended an implementation agency, which is against the norms. Unspent funds.

- In 11 states/ UTs, unfruitful expenditure worth Rs. 8.50 crore was incurred due, as incomplete works were suspended or abandoned.

- Unspent balances left by predecessor Rajya Sabha MPs in 10 states were not carried forward to the new MPs.
- Delays in sanctioning works were found. Lack of monitoring.

- 90% of audited District Authorities did not maintain asset/work register.

- Ministry could not ensure timely receipt of monthly progress reports.
- Functioning of state level monitoring committees was questionable.
- 86 District Authorities of 23 states/UT did not inspect any work in the period 2004-05 to 2008-09
