= Thanjavur Art Plate =

- Geographical indication
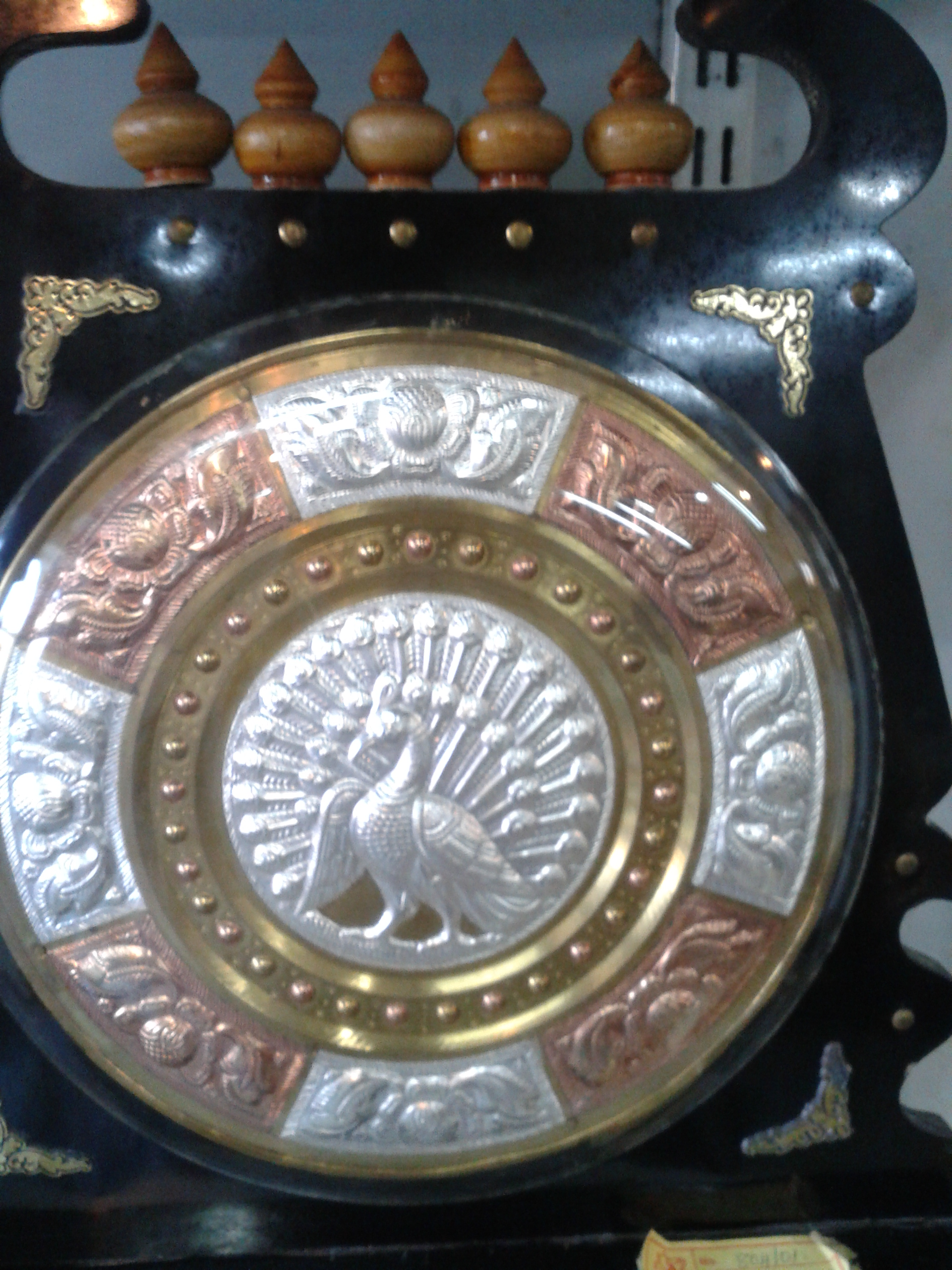
- Description: Art metal plates from Thanjavur region
- Type: Handicraft
- Area: Thanjavur, Tamil Nadu
- Country: India
- Registered: 2007–08
- Material: silver, copper, bronze

Thanjavur Art Plate is an artifact exclusively made in the Thanjavur region of Tamil Nadu, India. It is a circular plate consisting of silver, bronze, and copper embossed with figures of Hindu gods and goddesses at its center. The artwork has been registered for protection under the Geographical indication of the Trade Related Intellectual Property Rights (TRIPS) agreement. It is listed at item 63 of the Geographical Indications Act 1999 of the Government of India, with registration confirmed by the Controller General of Patents Designs and Trademarks in 2007–08. While the size of the article is permitted to be different, metal compositions and particularization have to remain the same to be identified with the unique indicator as per GI approval.

== History ==
The Thanjavur Art Plate or plaque was introduced by Rajah Serfoji-II (1777–1832) during the Maratha rule in Thanjavur. It was made as an exclusive gift item by the artisans of Thanjavur at the suggestion of the Rajah.

The artifact is crafted exclusively by the community of Vishwakarmas, which consists of a few goldsmith families of Thanjavur. It is an inherited art, and is a way of living for them. It is a declared cottage industry as it is made in the houses of the craftsmen. Its manufacture is the prerogative of the menfolk only.

A plaque made in the 20th century was displayed at the Government Museum in Thanjavur during 2011. This plaque made of the prescribed metals has in the relief images of Nataraja, the sage Pathanjali, and the goddess Sivakami in a standing posture over a lotus flower, encrusted at the plate's central part.

== Manufacturing ==
The artifact consists of three components: the base plate, a circular plate of metals with primary relief, and the secondary relief. Sheets of brass are used to make the base plate, silver sheets to craft the reliefs, lead to create moulds to project the three-dimensional images, and an asphalt or wax board to fix the plate. The base plate is prepared first by craftsman specialized in heavy metals. Then the crafting of designs or reliefs is done by jewelers, and the encrusting of the relief is the prerogative of the diamond-setting expert. The procedure of manufacture involves the making of the base plate followed by the casting of the copper plate, preparing moulds, and crafting the motifs on copper plates and dyes. The base plate is also covered with motifs. Floral and other designs are carved on the reliefs, and the product is then finished by polishing.

The art plates are marketed within the country and also exported. They are marketed by the artisans themselves or in handicraft showrooms and through exporters.
