= R. Doraikkannu =

Indian politician (1948–2020)

Thiru Doraikkannu

Minister for Agriculture
- In office 23 May 2016 – 31 October 2020
- Chief Minister: J. Jayalalithaa; O. Panneerselvam; Edappadi K. Palaniswami
- Preceded by: R. Vaithilingam
- Succeeded by: K. P. Anbalagan
- Constituency: Papanasam

Member of Tamil Nadu Legislative Assembly
- In office 19 May 2006 – 31 October 2020
- Chief Minister: M. Karunanidhi; J. Jayalalithaa; O. Panneerselvam; Edappadi K. Palaniswami
- Preceded by: M. Ramkumar
- Constituency: Papanasam

Personal details
- Born: 28 March 1948 Rajagiri, Madras State, Dominion of India (present-day Tamil Nadu, India)
- Died: 31 October 2020 (aged 72) Chennai, Tamil Nadu, India
- Party: All India Anna Dravida Munnetra Kazhagam
- Children: 6
- Education: Bachelor of Arts

Thiru R. Doraikkannu (28 March 1948 – 31 October 2020) was an Indian politician and member of the 15th Tamil Nadu Legislative Assembly from the Papanasam constituency. He represented the All India Anna Dravida Munnetra Kazhagam (AIADMK) party. He won his seats from Papanasam in the 2006, 2011 and 2016 elections.

J. Jayalalithaa appointed Doraikkannu as Minister for Agriculture in May 2016. This was his first cabinet post in the Government of Tamil Nadu.

== Biography ==
Doraikkannu was born on 28 March 1948, in Rajagiri. He had a B.A. degree and was married with six children.

He died on 31 October 2020, at the Kauvery Hospital in Chennai, of complications from COVID-19 during the COVID-19 pandemic in India. He was admitted to the hospital on 13 October 2020, and was on ECMO and ventilator life support, prior to his death. He is survived by his wife and children.
