= Tamil Maanila Congress (Moopanar) =

Indian political party

- Abbreviation: TMC(M)
- President: G. K. Vasan
- General Secretary: Vidiyal Sekar
- Treasurer: Dr. E. S. S. Raman Ex MLA (Pallipattu)
- Founder: G. K. Moopanar
- Founded: 29 March 1996; 30 years ago
- Split from: Tamil Nadu Congress Committee
- Headquarters: No. 4, Ashoka Road, Alwarpet, Chennai – 600018, Tamil Nadu, India.
- Student wing: TMC(M) Student Wing
- Youth wing: TMC(M) Youth Wing
- Women's wing: TMC(M) Women's Wing
- Labour wing: TMC(M) Labour Wing
- Ideology: Green politics Green conservatism
- Political position: Right-wing
- Colours: Orange
- ECI status: Registered Unrecognised State Party
- Alliance: Former Alliances: AIADMK+ (2001-2002; 2019-2024; 2025–2026) (Tamil Nadu); NDA (2019-2026); DMK-led Alliance (1996-1999) (Tamil Nadu); TMC-led Alliance (1999-2001) (Tamil Nadu); People's Welfare Front (2016) (Tamil Nadu)
- Seats in Rajya Sabha: 0 / 245
- Seats in Lok Sabha: 0 / 543
- Seats in Tamil Nadu Legislative Assembly: 0 / 234

Election symbol
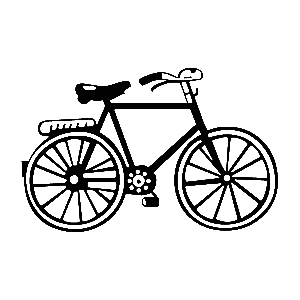

Party flag

Website
- tamilmaanilacongress.com

The Tamil Maanila Congress (Moopanar) alias Moopanar Congress (transl. Tamil State Congress (Moopanar); abbr. TMC(M)) is an Indian regional political party in the state of Tamil Nadu. It was founded by the G. K. Moopanar on 29 March 1996 as a breakaway faction from the Tamil Nadu Congress Committee. TMC won 41 seats in that election within 3 month's of formation of TMC(M). After Moopanar's death, the party's officials chose his son G. K. Vasan to lead the party in 2002. The TMC(M) was merged with Indian National Congress from 2002 to 2014. The party was again formed after a split from INC in November 2014.

It was allied with the All India Anna Dravida Munnetra Kazhagam and is part of the Indian political front, the National Democratic Alliance (NDA) in 2019.

== Party position ==
=== Mission ===
"To bring back the ‘Golden Rule’ of K. Kamarajar in the state of Tamil Nadu."

The party's mission is to provide:

- corruption-free public administration;
- sublime law and order without favouritism or discrimination;
- liquor-free Tamil Nadu; free, quality education for all;
- free medical facilities for all;
- conflict-free religious harmony;
- caste-free Tamil society;
- distribution of power to minority, Dalits and tribes;
- protection of women's rights
- ensured labour rights;
- social Justice with opportunity to all;
- economic development inclusive to all;
- uninterrupted power supply;
- regulated water management;
- profitable agriculture;
- abundant food supply;
- pollution-free environment;
- un-plunder natural resources;
- industrial development combined with increased job opportunities;
- decentralization of power to Panchayat Raj.

== Ideologies ==
=== Anti-divisive politics ===
The party strongly believes the need to realm India's pluralist traditions. G. K Moopanar always maintained to preserve the political decency and avoided a culture of violence and divisive politics. He strongly believed in grassroots democracy with people as the stakeholders in all the developmental projects.

=== Secularism ===
Tamil Maanila Congress (M) is existing in a political era of aggressive and conflict oriented politics. The party and the founder were crowned for taking a principled position in 1999 to reserve its political support to then ruling Union Government by not supporting the BJP.

== Flag & Symbol ==
=== Flag ===
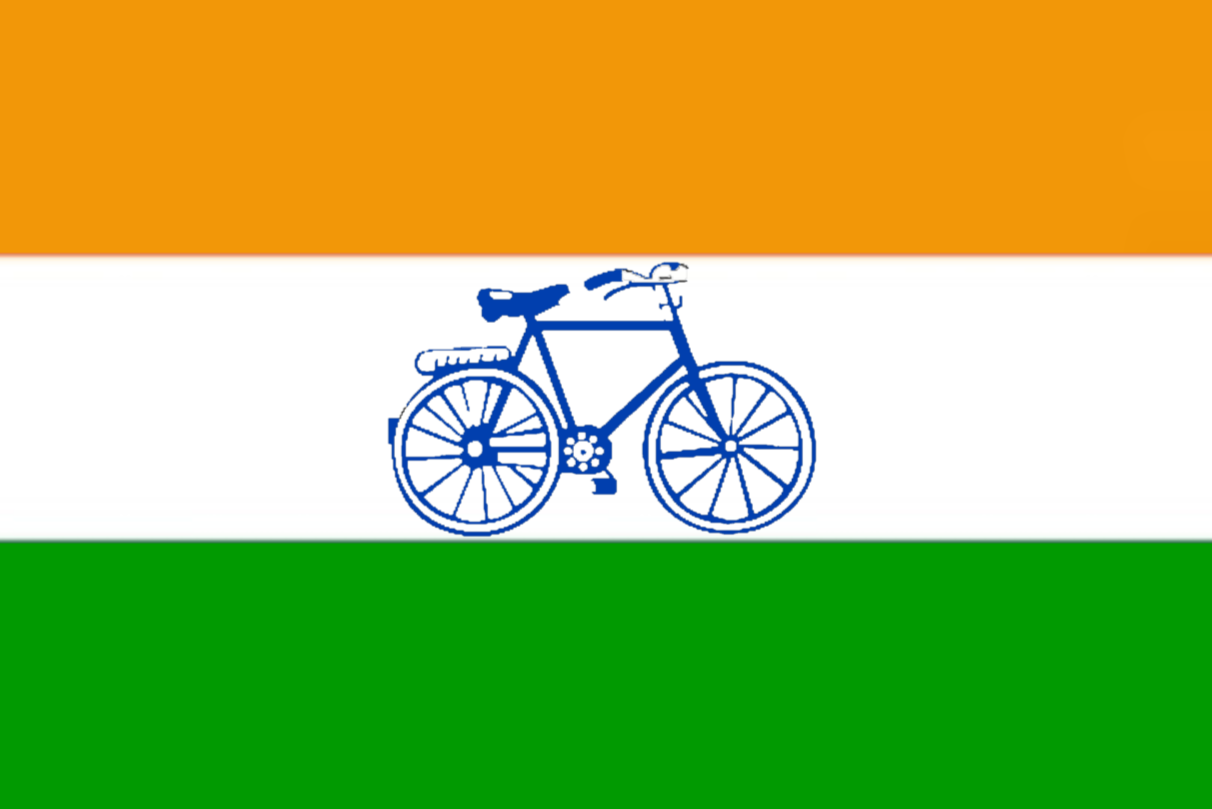
First flag of TMC.

In 1996, During the party's birth it had used flag similar to that of the Indian National Congress party and the Indian National Flag. The colour Orange represents sacrifice, white represents peace and green represents prosperity and had its electoral symbol at its centre instead of charkha. Later during the party's revival in 2014, the flag consist of Indian freedom fighter Kamarajar and founding father G K Moopanar.

=== Symbols used ===
- Cycle Symbol - used in 1996, 1998, 1999, 2024 general elections and 1996, 2001 Assembly elections.
- Coconut Farm - used in 2016 Assembly election.
- Auto Rickshaw - used in 2019 general election.
- Contested on AIADMK Symbol on 2021 in 6 seats.
- Contested on BJP Symbol in 2026 on 5 seats.

== History ==
=== G. K. Moopanar era (29 March 1996 – 30 August 2001) ===
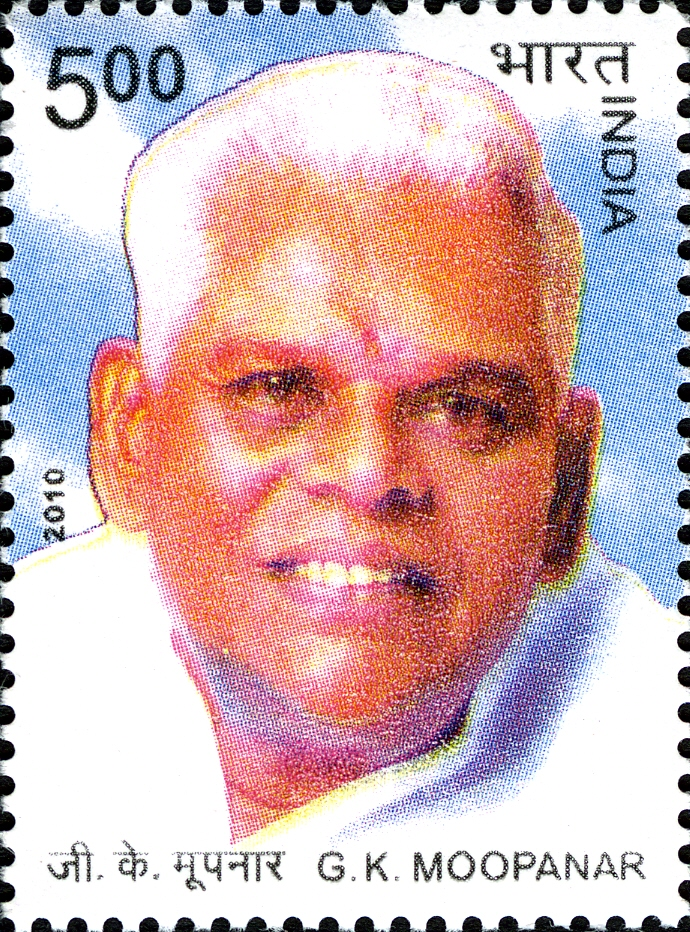
Thiru. G.K. Moopanar
Founder of the party

Following the high command's decision to restore relations with the AIADMK, Moopanar's followers in Congress(I) formed a new party at Thiruparankundram on March 29, 1996. Later, a new regional political party has been formed by Congressmen in the name of Tamil Nadu Makkal Congress, owing to loyalty to G. K. Moopanar on 1 April 1996.

G. K Moopanar was an influential political strategist and leader who chose to focus on party organization rather than holding public office. although considered for top leadership positions on multiple occasions, he preferred to select and support other leaders for those roles and focus on strengthening the party. in 1996, addressing regional aspiration, he founded the Tamil maanila Congress to promote clean and transparent politics.

G.K Moopanar was a follower of K. Kamarajar. K. Kamarajar had identified G. K Moopanar as his political heir.

In the early 1970s Indira Gandhi wished to integrate both Indian National Congress (O) and Indian National Congress (R) and merged both the parties. Moopanar who was faithful to the parent body was made the president of the Congress party in Tamil Nadu. The dramatic rise and spread of the Dravidian movement in the state shrunk the Congress, once the largest political party in the state.

Kamarajar identified Indira Gandhi for the leadership and G. K Moopanar along with other important national leaders identified the then Rajiv Gandhi for the top job.

Moopanar was committed to secularism and cultural pluralism, who completely devoted himself for the service to humanity. In recognizing his contribution to the nation, Indian postal department commemorated him by releasing a stamp in 2010.

In 1998, G K Moopanar's efforts ensured to declared a classical status to Tamil language by then Union Government in the year 2004.

In 1999, Moopanar refused to support the BJP-led government's vote of trust in Lok Sabha, which finally caused the collapse of the Vajpayee government due to the lack of just one vote. Moopanar argued that he had committed himself to secular values and would never endorse then BJP, even under pressure from his then major ally, late DMK leader M Karunanidhi. This was especially considering the fact that Moopanar only founded the party to support the DMK in the general elections of 1996.

=== G.K Vaasan's era (2001- present) ===
==== Merge with Congress ====
After the death of his father G K Moopanar in 2001, G. K Vasan was elected without opposition as the President of the TMC by the MLA's, MP's and senior officials of the party. After the death of his father Vaasan merged the TMC with the congress on 14 August 2002. The Dravida Munnetra Kazhagam and Congress together secured 163 of the 234 seats in the 2006 Assembly elections.

==== Split from Congress ====
On 3 November 2014, Vaasan split the party from Congress to start the Tamil Manila Congress again. In the 2016 Tamil Nadu Legislative Assembly election he faced a defeat when he contested as part of the People's welfare front.

==== 2019 Indian general elections - National Democratic alliance ====
In March 2019, TMC made alliance with the AIADMK in for the 2019 Indian general elections and was allotted one seat in the Thanjavur parliamentary constituency, contesting on the AIADMK symbol. The alliance was also part of the broader alliance with the National Democratic Alliance. A TMC leader said "We are not talking to the BJP; we will be part of the AIADMK alliance," Vasans move raised concerns when many secularist parties flocked to Congress to overthrow BJP.

== Administration and governance ==
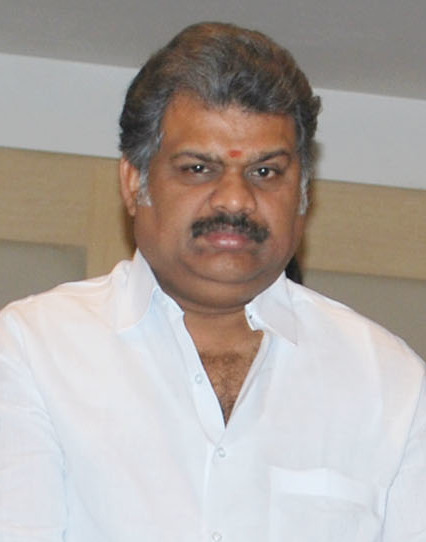
G. K. Vasan, President of the party

Under the leadership of G. K Vasan, the party is more concerned about the governance becoming mystified and administrations getting complicated. The party believes democracy is a culture and not the elections.

=== Lokayukta legislation ===
The party shall propose the passage of Lokayukta legislation in the state of Tamil Nadu, an establishment of anti-corruption institution to combat corruption in the government administrations.

=== Live Telecast of Assembly Proceedings ===
The party shall take up efforts to ‘Live Telecast the Assembly Proceedings’. "Right to Know" is the basic privilege of citizens in the nation. Therefore, the live telecast is the primary right and it will pave way for educating the citizens to know the process of government, discover the truth and strengthen individual capacity in decision-making process.

== Policies ==
=== Agriculture revival ===
G. K. Vasan, during his role as member of Consultative Committee for the Ministry of Agriculture between 2002 and 2004, dynamically backed the measures for National Food Security and building a Vibrant Rural Economy. In the recent protest by Tamil Nadu farmers in Jantar Mantar, New Delhi (between April–May 2017), which lasted for 41 days. G. K Vasan, himself a farmer took a leadership initiative to facilitate a meeting between agitating farmers and President of India, Shri Pranab Mukherjee.

=== Women's empowerment ===
The party strongly advocates the Women Reservation Bill. Vasan constantly bid for true gender equality. He believes a true change in women political representation is not by a woman from the traditional political base, rather from a village who is honest, sincere, committed and a woman rising from the grassroots to the democratic house, is the candid success.

The party's women's wing is striving to realize the goals; it has put forth.

- Goal 1. Respectable representation of women in social, economic and political systems.
- Goal 2. Equal pay for equal work on par with men.
- Goal 3. An end to Modern slavery – all kinds of violence against women and children.

=== Prohibition of alcohol ===
The party asserts prohibition of alcohol is the need of the hour and concerned over the present level of alcohol consumption among all sections of people including women and students. The president of the party Vasan strongly believes that state sponsored alcohol is not a revenue generator, but rather a social disaster. In action, the party has effectively demonstrated various campaigns, agitations and personal suit to put an end to alcoholism in the state. In one such effort, the party launched a statewide signature campaign in 2015 to create an awareness among the citizens and exert pressure on ruling government to abolish alcoholism. The party submitted the public receipts with a memorandum to then Hon. Governor Rosaiah, urging a statewide prohibition of Alcohol.

The party also opined to administrators to set up a rehabilitation centers for the citizens' welfare and facilitate alternative employment for the existing TASMAC employees without derailing their livelihood. The party has considered prohibition of alcohol as its one of its mission statements.

=== Welfare of fishermen ===
The party president, Vasan, Within 72 hours of party revival in 2014, visited Rameswaram to interact with the fishermen community and extend his support to them. The party feels the amicable solution to prevailing watershed can be a ‘bottoms-up approach’ in a way based on cultural, economic habits and needs of participating people from either nation. There is a historical connectivity among both citizens and one cannot lightly impose a nautical barrier and exert navy force. The party strongly believes an independent Union Ministry of Fisheries is required to address the present day challenges in a diplomatic, economic and technological framework.

=== Intraparty democracy ===
The Tamil Maanila Congress (M) is a grassroots pluralistic party which maintains intraparty democracy, a consensual approach to decision making; self-respect and gender equality. The party strongly believes in accommodating all sections of people in mainstream politics and confer not only reservation but due recognition, a respectable relationship across all human spectrum.

=== Support for Sri Lankan Tamils ===
G. K Vasan had also raised his objections and extended kindness for the welfare of Tamils in Sri Lanka and living elsewhere. In spite of his association with then ruling party, the Indian National Congress (in UPA regime) and holding a ministerial rank in the Union Government, he opposed the moves, the Government of India had extended to Sri Lankan government that deemed to be against the interests of island's Tamil citizens.

== Outreaches ==
The party has launched the 'e-kamarajar app' for the benefit of primary school children to bridge the gap in education affordability, provide free accessibility to latest educational contents, learning methods and improve the primary school completion ratio. The application is designed to provide fundamentals in Mathematics, English, Tamil and Brain Gym activities.

Vasan as Union Minister of Shipping in 2014 commemorated the freedom fighters, K. Kamaraj and V. O. Chidambaram Pillai by renaming the Ennore Port as Kamarajar Port Limited in Chennai, Tamil Nadu and Tuticorin Port Trust as V.O. Chidambaranar Port Trust in Thoothukkudi, Tamil Nadu.

== Election performance ==
=== Legislative Assembly ===
Year	Assembly	Seats contested	Seats won	(+/-) in seats	% of votes	Vote swing	Popular vote	Alliance	Outcome
1996	11th	40	39 / 234	New entry	9.30%	New entry	25,26,474	DMK+	Opposition
2001	12th	32	23 / 234	▼16	6.73%	▼2.57	18,85,726	AIADMK+	Opposition
2016	15th	26	0 / 234	▼23	0.53%	▼6.20	2,30,711	MNK	Lost
2021	16th	6 (Note: Since TMC(M) contested the election using the AIADMK symbol, the Election Commission officially recorded those candidates as AIADMK candidates. However, the vote share and seat share attributed to TMC(M) are calculated based on the constituencies where TMC(M) members were fielded under the AIADMK symbol.)	0 / 234	Steady	0.64%	▲0.11	2,95,016	NDA	Lost
2026	17th	5 (Note: Since TMC(M) contested the election using the BJP symbol, the Election Commission officially recorded those candidates as BJP candidates. However, the vote share and seat share attributed to TMC(M) are calculated based on the constituencies where TMC(M) members were fielded under the BJP symbol.)	0 / 234	Steady	0.39%	▼0.25	1,91,268	NDA	Lost

=== Lok Sabha ===
Year	Lok Sabha	Seats contested	Seats won	(+/-) in seats	% of votes	Vote swing	Popular vote	Alliance	Outcome
1996	11th	20	20 / 39	▲20	27.00%	▲27.00	73,39,982	DMK+	Government
1998	12th	20	3 / 39	▼17	20.19%	▼6.81	51,69,183	DMK+	Opposition
1999	13th	27	0 / 39	▼3	7.15%	▼13.04	19,46,899	TMC(M)+	Lost
2019	17th	1	0 / 39	Steady	0.51%	▼6.64	2,20,849	NDA	Lost
2024	18th	3	0 / 39	Steady	0.94%	▲0.43	4,10,401	NDA	Lost

=== Description ===
The party, Tamil Maanila Congress (M) in its debut election in 1996 to 11th Tamil Nadu State Legislative Assembly, contested in 41 constituencies along with its ally political partners. The grand ally recorded a victory by securing 231 out of 234 assembly constituencies and formed the 11th Tamil Nadu State Legislative Government. The party, Tamil Maanila Congress also secured an impressive election performance and became the principal opposition party in the assembly house. The party secured 39 legislative assembly constituencies out of 40 constituencies. It contested and secured 2,526,474 votes. The party chose the bicycle as its election symbol.

The 11th Tamil Nadu state legislative assembly elections were held simultaneously with the Indian Parliamentary Election to 11th Lok Sabha. Tamil Maanila Congress along with its ally political partners, again performed a landslide victory by winning the complete 39 parliamentary seats available in the state, Tamil Nadu. The party led in front by winning 20 out of 20 contested parliamentary seats by securing 7,339,982 (25.6%) votes.

Further, the party did not participate in the election to 13th and 14th Tamil Nadu state legislative assembly and in 14th and 16th Lok Sabha General Elections.

In the latest election to 15th Tamil Nadu State Assembly, the party participated together in an alliance PWF(People Welfare Front) and contested the election. The party was allotted 'Coconut Farm' as its election symbol and fielded 26 candidates, none of whom were elected.

== List of party leaders ==
=== Presidents ===
No.	Portrait	Name (Birth–Death)	Term in office		
No.	Portrait	Name (Birth–Death)	Assumed office	Left office	Time in office
1		G. K. Moopanar (1931–2001)	29 March 1996	30 August 2001	5 years, 154 days
2		G. K. Vasan (1964–)	1 September 2001	15 August 2002	348 days
2		G. K. Vasan (1964–)	24 April 2015	Incumbent	11 years, 198 days

== See also ==
- List of political parties in India
