= G. K. Moopanar =

Indian politician (1931–2001)

G. K. Mooppanar
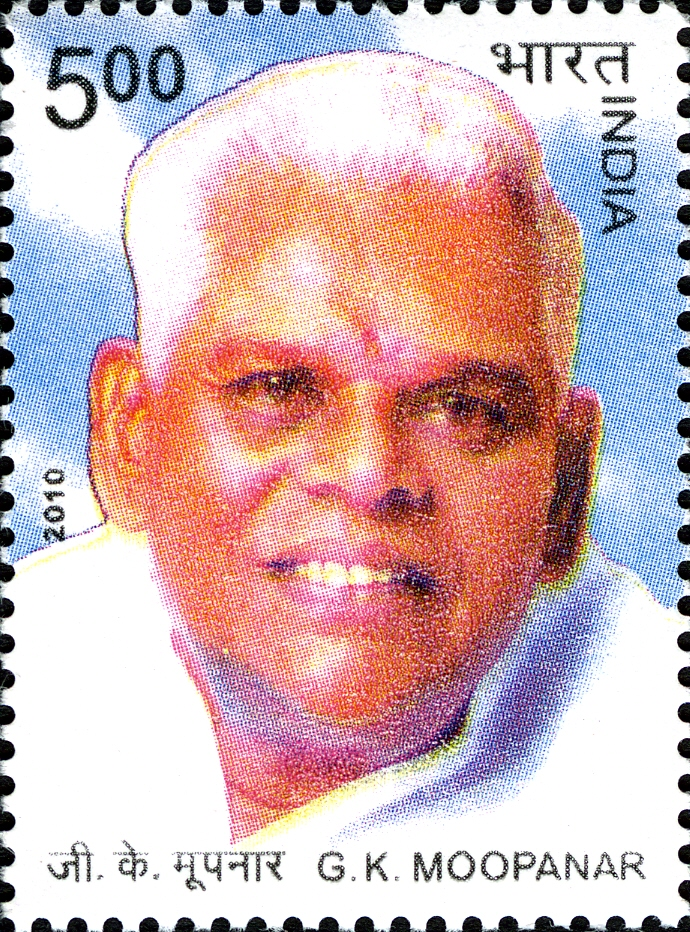
- Moopanar on a 2010 postage stamp of India

11th Leader of the Opposition in Tamil Nadu Legislative Assembly
- In office 19 January 1991 – 30 January 1991
- Chief Minister: M. Karunanidhi
- Preceded by: S. R. Eradha
- Succeeded by: S. R. Balasubramoniyan

President of Tamil Maanila Congress (Moopanar)
- In office 29 March 1996 – 30 August 2001
- Preceded by: position established
- Succeeded by: G. K. Vasan

General Secretary of All India Congress Committee
- In office 1980–1988
- President: Indira Gandhi, Rajiv Gandhi

Member of Parliament, Rajya Sabha
- In office 25 July 1977 – 30 August 2001

Personal details
- Born: Govindhasamy Karuppaiya Mooppanar; 19 August 1931 Sundaraperumal Kovil, Thanjavur, Madras Presidency, British India (now in Thanjavur District, Tamil Nadu, India)
- Died: 30 August 2001 (aged 70) Chennai, Tamil Nadu, India
- Party: Tamil Maanila Congress
- Other political affiliations: Indian National Congress (1955–1996); Congress (O) (1970–1977)
- Spouse: Kasthuri
- Children: G. K. Vasan; Usharani
- Parent(s): Father : Govindhasamy Mooppanar; Mother : Saraswathi Ammal
- Occupation: Politician; Agriculturalist; Social Worker; Philanthropist]; |

Govindhasamy Karuppaiya Mooppanar (19 August 1931 – 30 August 2001), known as G. K. Mooppanar, was a Tamil Nadu Congress Committee leader, parliamentarian, and social worker. He served as Member of the Rajya Sabha, president of Tamil Nadu Congress Committee and general secretary of All India Congress Committee from 1980 to 1988. Mooppanar was a close associate of Congress leader and former Tamil Nadu Chief Minister K. Kamarajar.

== Early life ==
- Mooppanar was born on 19 August 1931 at Kabisthalam village in the composite Thanjavur district the rice granary of Tamil Nadu. His father was R. Govindhasamy Mooppanar and his mother was Chellathammal. He belonged to a family of landed aristocracy that owned vast tracts of fertile land. His father R. Govindhasamy Mooppanar was a Congressman. The family patronised music, arts and literature. Mooppanar himself was president of the Thiruvaiyaru Sri Thiyaga Brahma Mahotsava Sabha from 1980 until his death. This Sabha conducts the annual Thiyagaraja music festival at Thiruvaiyaru, the saint-composer’s birthplace.

== Political career ==
- During his early years, Mooppanar driven by his admiration for the social reformer Periyar E. V. Ramasamy joined the Dravidar Kazhagam and remained active within the organization from 1951 to 1965.
- In the subsequent period, he began his involvement with the Congress Party his family's traditional political home. Specifically, starting in the latter half of 1970, he became active in the Congress (O) the faction led by the towering figure of that era, Kamarajar having joined its ranks through Kumari Ananthan, a prominent Congress leader of the time.
- After Kamarajar’s death on 2 October 1975, the two Congress factions in Tamil Nadu merged in 1976. At the merger function, Indira Gandhi announced that Mooppanar would be the president of the unified TNCC.
- From then onwards, his rise in the Congress was swift. He was TNCC president from 1976 to 1980, and again in 1988–89. He was a puissant AICC general secretary from 1980 to 1988. Mooppanar founded the Tamil Maanila Congress in the year 1996 (TMC) party. He was a Rajya Sabha member when he died. Both Indira Gandhi and Rajiv Gandhi offered him ministership but he declined.

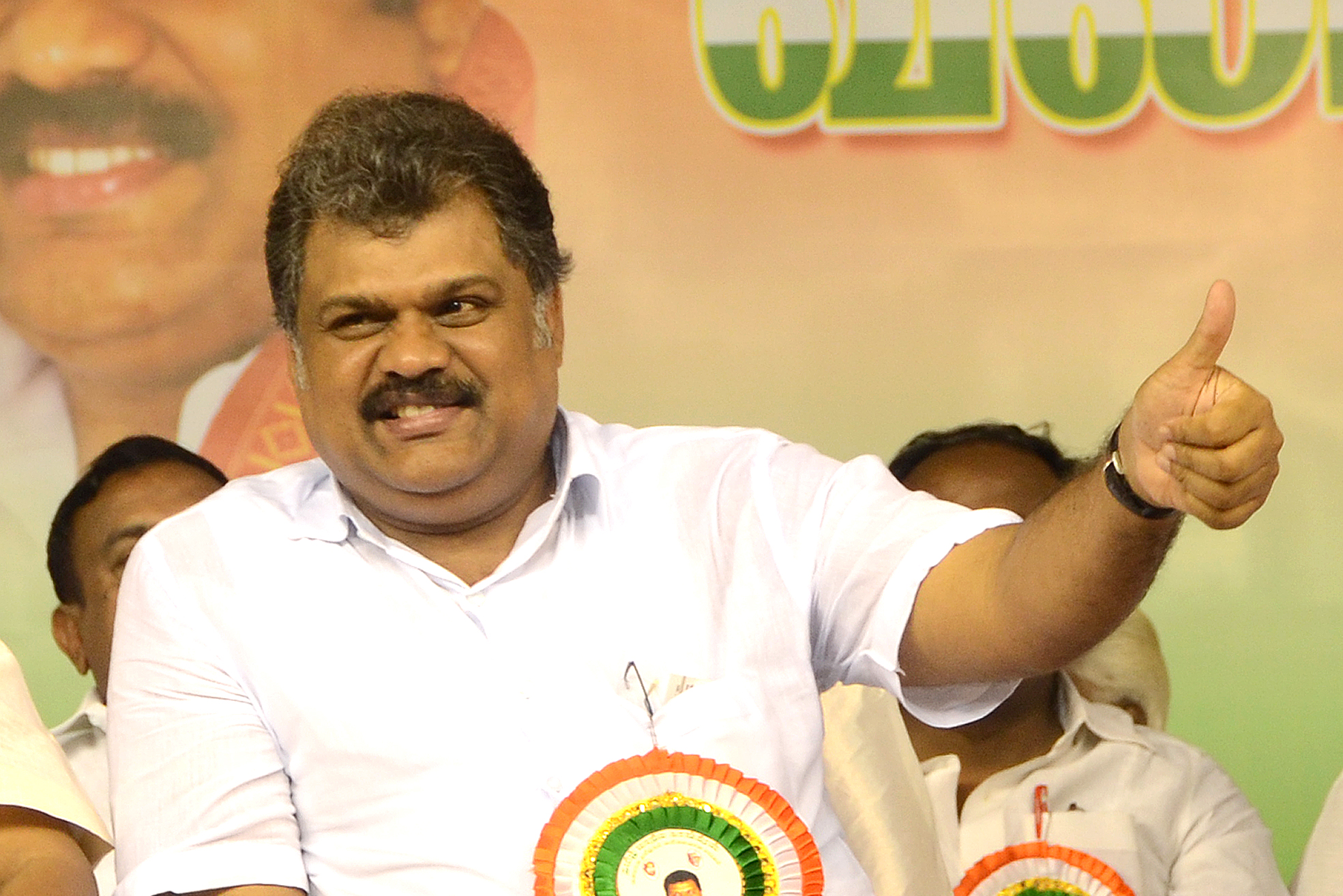
G. K. Vasan, son of G. K. Moopanar

- He also shunned the Prime Minister’s post offered to him in April 1997 after the fall of the United Front government led by H.D. Deve Gowda. In a volume titled Makkal Thalaivar Mooppanar, published by a TMC leader in August 2000, former Union Minister R. Dhanuskodi Athithan has recalled that CPI(M) general secretary Harkishan Singh Surjeet declared that "Mr. Mooppanar is the best and first choice" for the prime ministership. West Bengal Chief Minister Jyoti Basu seconded the choice. However Mr. Mooppanar didn't accept it.
- Mooppanar died on 30 August 2001, 11 days after celebrating his 70th birthday, at Sri Ramachandra Hospital in Chennai, following a bout of pneumonia. He was admitted there on 31 July for a hip surgery, which was successful, but he suffered pneumonia as a complication, and his condition turned worse due to pulmonary edema. His dead body was taken to his home and Rajaji Hall, and was later cremated with full state honours at Kamarajar Ground in Chennai on 31 August, in the presence of many people.
- The TMC felt orphaned with the death of Mooppanar. The party quickly tried to steady itself when at a meeting of its legislators, Rajya Sabha members and leaders on 1 September, Mooppanar’s son G. K. Vasan was elected TMC president.

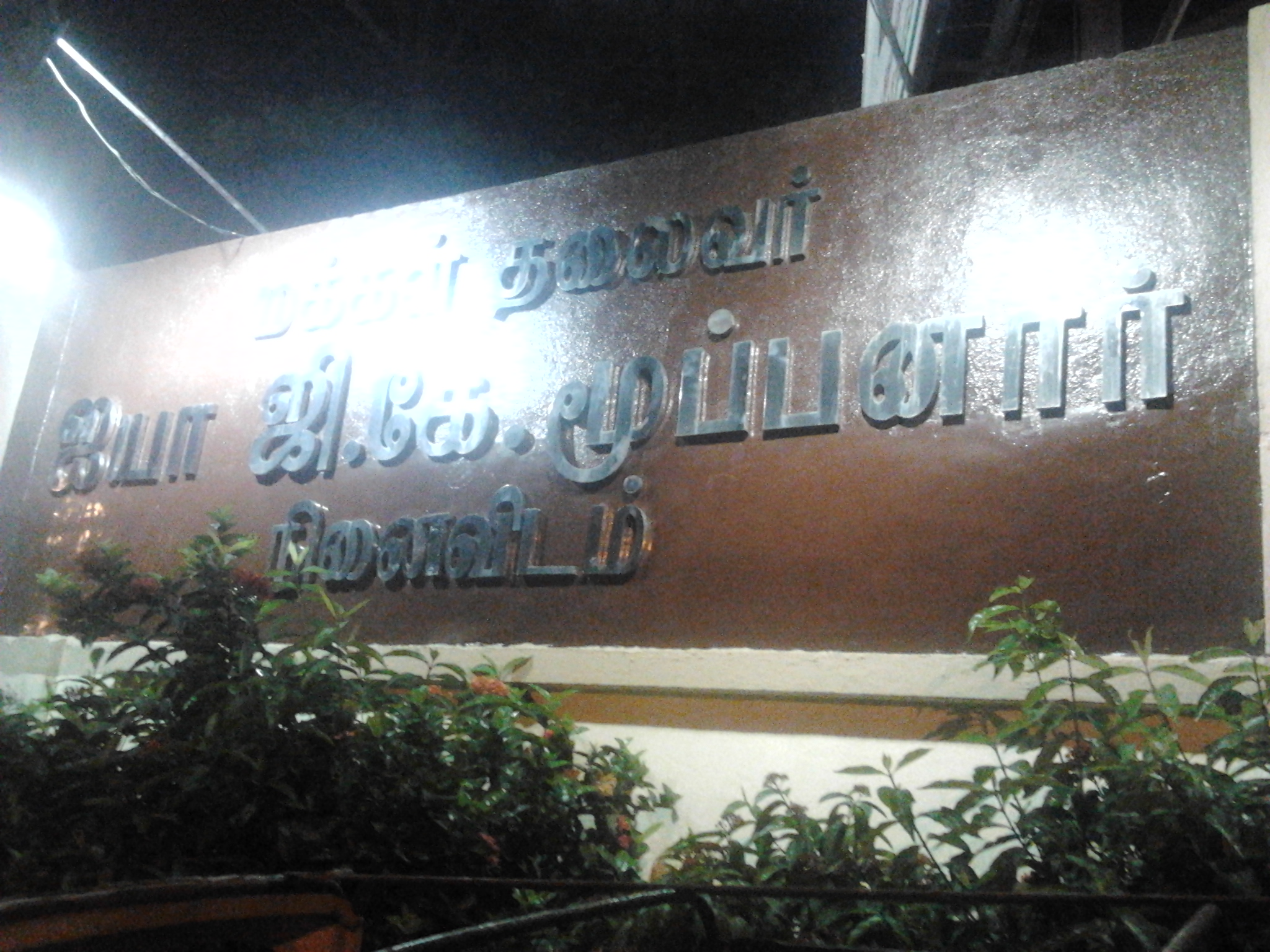
G. K. Mooppanar memorial

- After the demise of Mooppanar, under Vasan's leadership, the TMC merged back with the Congress led by Soniya Gandhi.

== Rajya Sabha Election History ==
Position	Party	Constituency	From	To	Tenure
Member of Parliament, Rajya Sabha (1st Term)	INC	Tamil Nadu	25 July 1977	24 July 1983	5 years, 364 days
Member of Parliament, Rajya Sabha (2nd Term)	INC	Tamil Nadu	25 July 1983	2 February 1989	5 years, 192 days
Member of Parliament, Rajya Sabha (3rd Term)	INC	Tamil Nadu	25 July 1995	9 September 1997	2 years, 46 days
Member of Parliament, Rajya Sabha (4th Term)	TMC(M)	Tamil Nadu	30 June 1998	30 August 2001	3 years, 61 days
