= Political families of Tamil Nadu =

TN Political families

The list of political families of Tamil Nadu state in India.

== Families in Dravida Munnetra Kazhagam (DMK) ==
=== The Karunanidhi Family - Dravida Munnetra Kazhagam ===
- Late M. Karunanidhi, former Chief Minister of Tamil Nadu.
  - M. K. Stalin, five-time MLA, former Deputy Chief Minister, DMK Youth Wing President (1982–2017) Chief Minister of Tamil Nadu (2021–2026) (son of Karunanidhi)
  - Udhayanidhi Stalin, son of M.K.Stalin. He is DMK 's youth wing secretary and Minister for Youth Welfare and Sports Development of Tamil Nadu(2022 - 2026)
  - . Deputy chief minister of tamilnadu (2024 - 2026).( Son of M.K. Stalin).
  - M. K. Alagiri, former Union Minister in Government of India (Eldest son of Karunanidhi)
  - Kanimozhi, Member of Parliament from Lok Sabha (Daughter of Karunanidhi)
  - Late Murasoli Maran, former Union Minister in Government of India (nephew of Karunanidhi)
    - Dayanidhi Maran, Member of Parliament from Lok Sabha and former Union Minister in Government of India (son of Murasoli).

=== The Durai Murugan Family - DMK ===
- Durai Murugan (Former Minister for Water Resources of Tamil Nadu)
  - Kathir Anand Member of Parliament from Vellore (Lok Sabha constituency) (Only Son of Durai Murugan)

=== The P.T.R Family - DMK ===
- P. T. Rajan, Chief Minister of Madras Presidency in 1936.
  - P. T. R. Palanivel Rajan, former Speaker of the Tamil Nadu Legislative Assembly and former Minister in the State Cabinet.
  - P.T.R.Palanivel Thiyagarajan, IT minister of Tamil Nadu.

=== The T R Baalu Family - DMK ===
- T R Baalu, MP from Sriperumbudur and Treasurer of DMK
  - T R B Rajaa, MLA from Mannargudi, Minister for Industries, Investments and Commerce in GoTN, Secretary of DMK IT Wing

=== The V. Thangapandian Family - DMK ===
- V. Thangapandian Former MLA Aruppukottai (state assembly constituency)
  - Thangam ThennarasuMinister for Finance and HR Management in GoTN
  - Thamizhachi Thangapandian, Daughter of [V. Thangapandian]. She is member of Parliament Chennai South (Lok Sabha constituency)

=== The I. Periyasamy Family - DMK ===
- I. Periyasamy, 2021 Minister of Rural Development, Government of Tamil Nadu.
  - I P Senthil Kumar, Son of I.Periyasamy, an MLA from Attur (state assembly constituency)

=== The Anbil P. Dharmalingam Family - DMK ===
- Anbil P. Dharmalingam, was one of the founder-members of the Dravida Munnetra Kazhagam (DMK)
  - Anbil Poyyamozhi, son of Anbil P. Dharmalingam, Former minister of School Education of Tamil Nadu,
    - Anbil Mahesh Poyyamozhi, son of Anbil Poyyamozhi a member of Dravida Munnetra Kazhagam, Minister for School Education in Tamil Nadu
  - Anbil Periyasamy, son of Anbil P. Dharmalingam, Former Member of the Legislative Assembly of Tamil Nadu, Tiruchirappalli – II

=== The K. Anbazhagan Family - DMK ===
- K. Anbazhagan, Former minister of Finance.
  - A.Vetriazhagan, Grandson of K. Anbazhagan, an MLA from Villivakkam (state assembly constituency)

=== The K. Ponmudy Family - DMK ===
- K. Ponmudy, Minister of Higher Education of Tamil Nadu
  - Gautham Sigamani, Son of K.Ponmudy, an MP from Kallakurichi (Lok Sabha constituency)

=== The Aladi Aruna (alias) V Arunachalam Family - DMK ===
- Aladi Aruna, Former Minister of Law
  - Poongothai Aladi Aruna, Daughter of Aladi Aruna, Former minister of Tamil Nadu for Information Technology

=== The N. V. Natarajan Family - DMK ===
- N. V. Natarajan Founding member of DMK. He was former minister for Labour and Backward classes in Tamil Nadu Government during 1969 - 1975
  - N. V. N. Somu Son of N. V. Natarajan. He was former Lok Shaba member.
    - Kanimozhi NVN Somu Daughter of N. V. N. Somu Member of Rajya Shaba from DMK.

=== The Arcot N. Veeraswami Family - DMK ===
- Arcot N. Veeraswami Former treasurer of DMK, Former Minister of DMK
  - Kalanidhi Veeraswamy Member of Lok Shaba from North Chennai constituency

=== N. Periasamy's family ===
- N. Periasamy, Former Member of the Legislative Assembly from Thoothukkudi
  - P. Geetha Jeevan, Minister for Social Welfare and Women Empowerment of Tamil Nadu (Daughter of N. Periasamy)
  - P. Jegan, Mayor of the Thoothukkudi City Municipal Corporation (Son of N. Periasamy)

=== The K. P. P. Samy Family - DMK ===
- K. P. P. Samy, former Minister for Fisheries in Tamil Nadu state of India
  - K P Shankar, brother of K. P. P. Samy, member Legislative Assembly from the Tiruvottiyur constituency in 2021

=== The S. Sivasubramanian Family - DMK ===
- S. Sivasubramanian, Member of the Legislative Assembly of Tamil Nadu from Andimadam constituency in 1989 election
  - S. S. Sivasankar, Minister for Transport

== The Families in Congress ==
=== The Rajagopalachari Family - Congress ===
- Late C. Rajagopalachari, Chief Minister of Madras Presidency (1937–40), Madras State (1952–54), Governor of West Bengal (1946–48), Governor-General of India (1948–50). Union Minister in Government of India (1950–52).
  - Gopalkrishna Gandhi, Governor of West Bengal.
  - C. R. Narasimhan, Former Member of Lok Sabha from Krishnagiri.

=== The C.P.Ramaswami Iyer family - Congress ===
- C. P. Ramaswami Iyer, Member of Madras Legislative Council and Diwan of Travancore.
  - C. R. Pattabhi Raman, Former Member of Lok Sabha from Kumbakonam.

=== The P. Chidambaram Family - Congress ===
- P. Chidambaram, Former Minister for Finance, Corporate affairs, Law and Justice, Commerce and Industries, Home Affairs of India. Presently an elected Member of Rajyasabha.
  - Karti P. Chidambaram, Elected Member of Lokshaba from Sivaganga.

=== The E. M. Sudarsana Natchiyappan Family - Congress ===
- E. M. Sudarsana Natchiyappan, Former Member of Lokshaba from Sivaganga.
  - Manickam Tagore, Elected Member of Lokshaba from Virudhunagar.

=== The Bhaktavatsalam Family - Congress ===
- M. Bhaktavatsalam, Chief Minister of Madras state (1962–1967).
- Jayanthi Natarajan, Former Member of Indian Parliament.

== Families in the All India Anna Dravida Munnetra Kazhagam (AIADMK) ==
=== M. G. Ramachandran's family ===
- M. G. Ramachandran, Former Chief Minister of Tamil Nadu
  - V. N. Janaki Ramachandran, Former Chief Minister of Tamil Nadu (Wife of M. G. Ramachandran)

=== C. Venugopal's family ===
- C. Venugopal, Former Member of Parliament, Lok Sabha from Vandavasi
  - C. Ve. Shanmugam, Former Minister for Law, Courts and Prisons Tamil Nadu (Son of C. Venugopal)

=== D. Jayakumar's family ===
- D. Jayakumar, Former Speaker of the Tamil Nadu Legislative Assembly
  - J. Jayavardhan, Former Member of Parliament, Lok Sabha from Chennai South (Son of D. Jayakumar)

=== O. Paneerselvam's family ===
- O. Paneerselvam, Former Chief Minister of Tamil Nadu
  - P. Ravindhranath, Former Member of Parliament, Lok Sabha from Theni (Son of O. Panneerselvam)

=== P. H. Pandian's family ===
- P. H. Pandian, Former Speaker of the Tamil Nadu Legislative Assembly
- Paul Manoj Pandian, Former Member of Parliament, Rajya Sabha (Son of P. H. Pandian)

=== Singai Govindarasu's family ===
- Singai Govindarasu, Former Member of the Legislative Assembly from Singanallur
  - Singai G. Ramachandran, Students' Wing Secretary of the AIADMK (Son of Singai Govindarasu)

=== V. M. C. Varada's family ===
- V. M. C. Varada, Former Member of the Legislative Assembly from Neravy – T. R. Pattinam
  - V. M. C. V. Ganapathy, Former Member of the Legislative Assembly from Neravy – T. R. Pattinam (Son of V. M. C. Varada)

=== V. P. Balasubramanian's family ===
- V. P. Balasubramanian, Former Deputy Speaker of the Tamil Nadu Legislative Assembly
  - V. P. B. Paramasivam, Former Member of the Legislative Assembly from Vedasandur (Son of V. P. Balasubramanian)

=== V. V. Rajan Chellappa's family ===
- V. V. Rajan Chellappa, Former Member of Parliament, Rajya Sabha
  - V. V. R. Raj Satyen, IT Wing Secretary of the AIADMK (Son of V. V. Rajan Chellappa)

== Families in multiparties ==
=== The Kumaramangalam Family - Multiparty ===
- Late P. Subbarayan, former Chief Minister of Madras Presidency (1926–1930), Member of Lok Sabha from Tiruchengode
- Radhabai Subbarayan, Famous human rights activist
  - Mohan Kumaramangalam, politician and trade union leader from the Communist Party of India.
    - Rangarajan Kumaramangalam, Indian politician. Member of Lok Sabha from Salem and later, Tiruchirapalli and Union Minister in Government of India
    - Lalitha Kumaramangalam, politician and member of the BJP's national executive.
  - Parvathi Krishnan, Former Member of Lok Sabha from Coimbatore.

=== The V. K. Sasikala Family - Multi Parties ===
- VK Sasikala, Indian Businesswoman turned Politician
- M. Natarajan, Sasikala's husband
- V. K. Dhivakaran, Founder of defunct party Anna Dravidar Kazhagam and brother of VK Sasikala
- T. T. V. Dhinakaran, General Secretary of Ammk and Sasikala's elder Sister Vanimani's Son
  - Anuradha Dhinakaran, Dhinakaran's wife.
- V. N. Sudhakaran, Jayalalithaa's ex-foster son and brother of TTV Dhinakaran
- T. T. V. Bhaskaran, Founder General Secretary of Anna Mgr Makkal Munnetra Kazhagam and brother of TTV Dhinakaran
- J. Illavarsi, Sasikala's brother Jayaraman's widow
- Vivek Jayaraman, Sasikala's brother Jayaraman's son

=== The Vasanth Family ===
- H. Vasanthakumar - INC, three-time Member of Lok Sabha from Kanniyakumari
  - Vijay Vasanth - INC, (son of H. Vasanthakumar) Member of Lok Sabha from Kanniyakumari
- Kumari Ananthan- Gandhi Kamaraj National Congress, Thondar Congress, INC, (elder brother of H. Vasanthakumar) - former Member of Lok Sabha from Nagercoil, Two-time MLA from Thiruvottiyur and Radhapuram from Gandhi Kamaraj National Congress, Two-time MLA from Sathankulam Assembly constituency from INC.
- Tamilisai Soundararajan - BJP, (niece of H. Vasanthakumar), former Governor of Telangana and Lieutenant Governor of Puducherry (Additional Charge).

== Family in MDMK ==
=== The Vaiko Family - MDMK ===
- Vaiko, founder of the Marumalarchi Dravida Munnetra Kazhagam.
  - Durai Vaiyapuri, Internet wing MDMK.

== Family in PMK ==
=== The Ramadoss Family - PMK ===
- S. Ramadoss PMK founder
- Anbumani Ramadoss Member of Parliament from Rajya Sabha and former Cabinet Minister (Ministry of Health) during 2004-09

== Families in the Tamil Maanila Congress (Moopanar) (TMC(M)) ==
=== G. K. Moopanar's family ===
- G. K. Moopanar, Former Member of Parliament, Rajya Sabha from Tamil Nadu
  - G. K. Vasan, Former Minister of Shipping of India (Son of G. K. Moopanar)
