= Kumaramangalam (disambiguation) =

Kumaramangalam is an Indian village. It may also refer to:

== People ==
- Paramasiva Prabhakar Kumaramangalam
- Rangarajan Kumaramangalam
- Kumaramangalam Birla
- Mohan Kumaramangalam
- Lalitha Kumaramangalam

== Other ==
- Government Mohan Kumaramangalam Medical College
- Kumaramangalam estate
- General Kumaramangalam Colony
- Kumaramangalam kulithalai
- Kumaramangalam political Family
- Kumaramangalam, Thanjavur
