= Anbil =

Anbil அன்பில்
- Pronunciation: Aṉpil
- Gender: Male, Female
- Language: Tamil

Origin
- Region of origin: Southern India; North-eastern Sri Lanka

Anbil (Tamil: அன்பில்) is a Tamil male given name. Due to the Tamil tradition of using patronymic surnames it may also be a surname for males and females.

== Notable people ==
=== Given name ===
- Anbil P. Dharmalingam, Indian politician

=== Surname ===
- Anbil Periyasamy, Indian politician
- Anbil Poyyamozhi, Indian politician

== Other uses ==
- Anbil Dharmalingam Agricultural College and Research Institute, college in Tamil Nadu
- Anbilalanturai, temple in Tamil Nadu
