= Tiruchirappalli Lok Sabha constituency =

Parliamentary constituency in Tamil Nadu, India

Coordinates: 10.8°N 78.7°E

Tiruchirappalli
- Lok Sabha constituency
- Interactive map of Tiruchirappalli Loksabha constituency, post-2008 delimitation

Constituency details
- Country: India
- Region: South India
- State: Tamil Nadu
- Assembly constituencies: Srirangam; Tiruchirappalli (West); Tiruchirappalli (East); Thiruverumbur; Gandharvakottai; Pudukkottai
- Established: 1952
- Total electors: 15,56,776
- Reservation: None

Member of Parliament
- 18th Lok Sabha
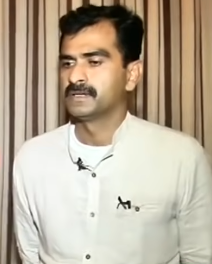
- Incumbent Durai Vaiyapuri
- Party: MDMK
- Alliance: INDIA
- Elected year: 2024

Tiruchirappalli is a Lok Sabha (Parliament of India) constituency in Tamil Nadu. Its Tamil Nadu Parliamentary Constituency number is 24 of 39.

== Assembly segments ==
=== From 2009 ===
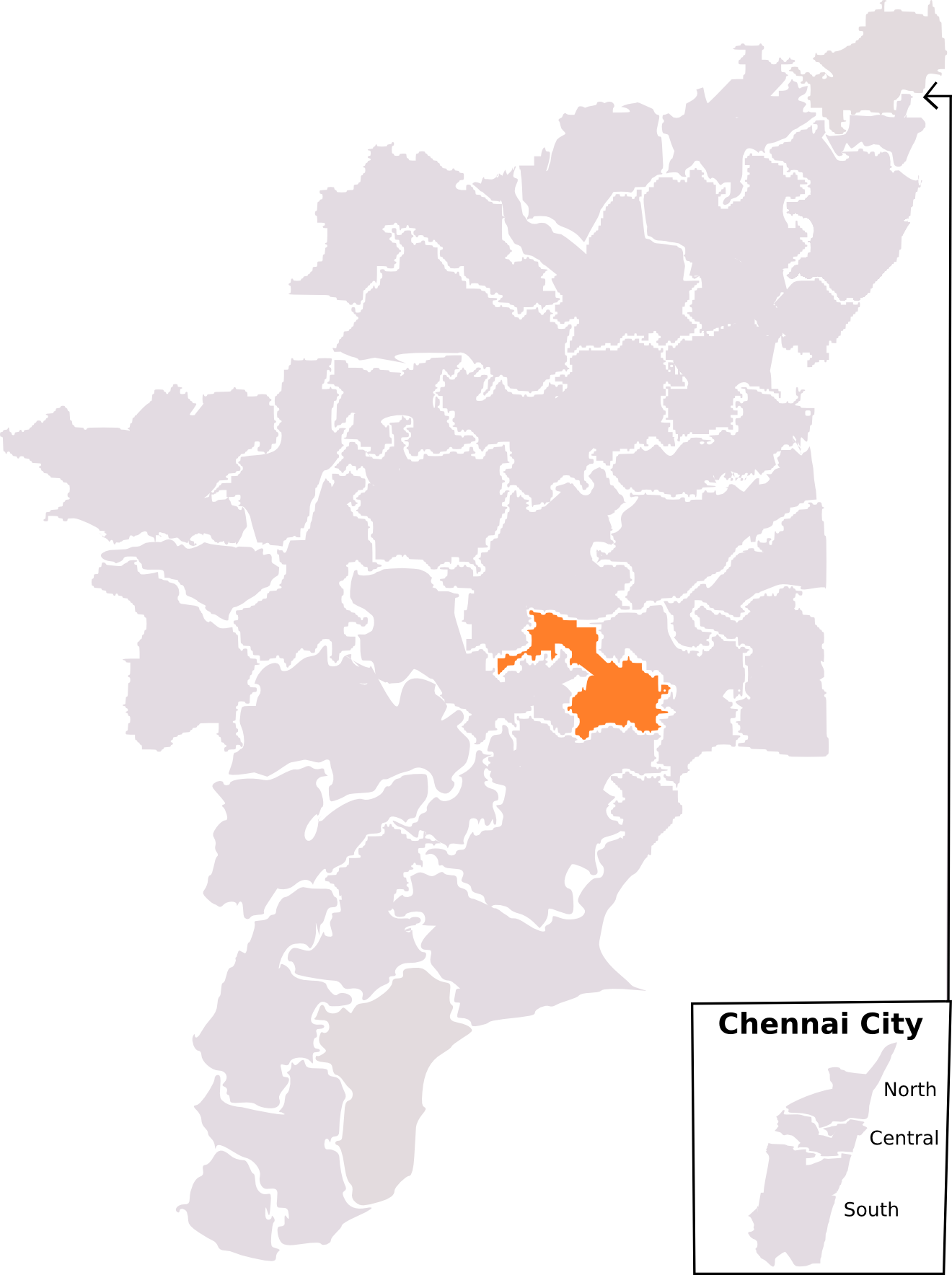
Tiruchirappalli constituency as laid out by 2008 Delimitation

The constituency comprises the following assembly segments:

Constituency number	Name	Reserved for (SC/ST/None)	District	Party	2024 Lead
139.	Srirangam	None	Tiruchirappalli	TVK	MDMK
140.	Tiruchirappalli West	None	Tiruchirappalli	DMK	MDMK
141.	Tiruchirappalli East	None	Tiruchirappalli	TVK	MDMK
142.	Tiruverumbur	None	Tiruchirappalli	TVK	MDMK
178.	Gandharvakottai	SC	Pudukottai	TVK	MDMK
180.	Pudukkottai	None	Pudukottai	DMK	MDMK

=== Before 2009 ===
The constituency comprised

1. Musiri (moved to Perambalur Constituency)
2. Lalgudi (moved to Perambalur Constituency)
3. Srirangam
4. Tiruchirappalli - I (defunct)
5. Tiruchirappalli - II (defunct)
6. Tiruverumbur

== Members of Parliament ==
Year	Winning Candidate	Party
1952	Dr.E.P Mathuram	Independent
1957	M.K.M. Abdul Salam	Indian National Congress
1962	K. Ananda Nambiar	Communist Party of India
1967	K. Ananda Nambiar	Communist Party of India (Marxist)
1971	M. Kalyanasundaram	Communist Party of India
1977	M. Kalyanasundaram	Communist Party of India
1980	N. Selvaraj	Dravida Munnetra Kazhagam
1984	L. Adaikalaraj	Indian National Congress
1989	L. Adaikalaraj	Indian National Congress
1991	L. Adaikalaraj	Indian National Congress
1996	L. Adaikalaraj	Tamil Maanila Congress
1998	Rangarajan Kumaramangalam	Bharatiya Janata Party
1999	Rangarajan Kumaramangalam	Bharatiya Janata Party
2001^	Dalit Ezhilmalai	All India Anna Dravida Munnetra Kazhagam
2004	L. Ganesan	Marumalarchi Dravida Munnetra Kazhagam
2009	P. Kumar	All India Anna Dravida Munnetra Kazhagam
2014	P. Kumar	All India Anna Dravida Munnetra Kazhagam
2019	Su. Thirunavukkarasar	Indian National Congress
2024	Durai Vaiyapuri	Marumalarchi Dravida Munnetra Kazhagam

== Election results ==
Vote share of Winning candidates
2024	51.35%
2019	59.70%
2014	47.49%
2009	41.65%
2004	63.68%
2001	48.38%
1999	54.61%
1998	48.39%
1996	62.65%
1991	63.99%
1989	61.06%
1984	58.05%
1980	54.32%
1977	57.10%
1971	49.34%
1967	50.32%
1962	47.80%
1957	42.60%
1951	43.82%

=== General elections 2024 ===
2024 Indian general election: Tiruchirappalli
Party	Candidate	Votes	%	±%
MDMK	Durai Vaiko	542,213	51.35	51.35
AIADMK	P. Karuppaiah	2,29,119	21.70	21.70
AMMK	Senthilnathan	1,00,747	9.54	New
NOTA	None of the Above	13,849	1.31	−0.08
Margin of victory		3,13,094	29.65	−14.48
Turnout		10,56,843	67.98	−1.52
Registered electors		15,53,985		2.98
MDMK gain from INC		Swing		

=== General elections 2019 ===
2019 Indian general election: Tiruchirappalli
Party	Candidate	Votes	%	±%
INC	Su. Thirunavukkarasar	621,285	59.70	54.36
DMDK	Dr. V. Elangovan	1,61,999	15.57	5.75
Independent	Charubala Tondaiman	1,00,818	9.69	
MNM	V. Anandharaja	42,134	4.05	
NOTA	None of the above	14,437	1.39	−0.98
Margin of victory		4,59,286	44.13	28.55
Turnout		10,40,711	69.50	−0.63
Registered electors		15,08,963		8.78
INC gain from AIADMK		Swing	12.21	

=== General elections 2014 ===
2014 Indian general election: Tiruchirappalli
Party	Candidate	Votes	%	±%
AIADMK	P. Kumar	458,478	47.49	5.84
DMK	Mu. Anbhalagan	3,08,002	31.90	
DMDK	A. M. G. Vijaykumar	94,785	9.82	1.21
INC	Charubala Tondaiman	51,537	5.34	−35.71
NOTA	None of the above	22,848	2.37	
CPI(M)	S. Sridhar	17,039	1.76	
AAP	P. Ravi	4,885	0.51	
Margin of victory		1,50,476	15.59	14.98
Turnout		9,65,402	71.28	2.40
Registered electors		13,87,140		29.98
AIADMK hold		Swing	5.84	

=== General elections 2009 ===
2009 Indian general election: Tiruchirappalli
Party	Candidate	Votes	%	±%
AIADMK	P. Kumar	298,710	41.65	8.58
INC	Charubala Tondaiman	2,94,375	41.05	
DMDK	A. M. G. Vijaykumar	61,742	8.61	
BJP	R. Lalitha Kumaramangalam	30,329	4.23	
Makkal Manadu	P. Ravi	5,016	0.70	
BSP	N. Kalyana Sundaram	4,897	0.68	0.06
Margin of victory		4,335	0.60	−30.00
Turnout		7,17,165	67.33	7.81
Registered electors		10,67,193		−10.49
AIADMK gain from MDMK		Swing	-22.02	

=== General elections 2004 ===
2004 Indian general election: Tiruchirappalli
Party	Candidate	Votes	%	±%
MDMK	L. Ganesan	450,907	63.68	
AIADMK	M. Paranjothi	2,34,182	33.07	
Independent	P. Ravi	7,831	1.11	
BSP	M. Ramesh	4,418	0.62	
Margin of victory		2,16,725	30.60	17.70
Turnout		7,08,137	59.48	2.99
Registered electors		11,92,254		−4.31
MDMK gain from AIADMK		Swing	9.06	

=== By-election 2001 ===
2001 Byelection: Tiruchirappalli
Party	Candidate	Votes	%	±%
AIADMK	Dalit Ezhilmalai	343,874	48.38	
BJP	M. N. Sukumar	3,26,461	45.93	−8.68
Independent	P. Ravi	16,417	2.31	
Independent	G. Hariharan	6,053	0.82	
Margin of victory		17,413	2.45	−8.64
Turnout		7,10,830	58.03	1.63
Registered electors		12,24,893		−1.69
AIADMK gain from BJP		Swing	-6.23	

=== General elections 1999 ===
1999 Indian general election: Tiruchirappalli
Party	Candidate	Votes	%	±%
BJP	Rangarajan Kumaramangalam	377,450	54.61	52.48
INC	L. Adaikalaraj	2,88,253	41.71	17.26
TMC(M)	M. Rajasekaran	17,256	2.50	
Margin of victory		89,197	12.91	11.09
Turnout		6,91,136	56.40	−10.91
Registered electors		12,45,971		5.75
BJP hold		Swing	-8.04	

=== General elections 1998 ===
1998 Indian general election: Tiruchirappalli
Party	Candidate	Votes	%	±%
BJP	Rangarajan Kumaramangalam	305,233	48.39	
TMC(M)	L. Adaikalaraj	2,93,778	46.57	
INC	Subbha Somu	23,747	3.76	
PT	K. Sachidanandam	4,979	0.79	
Margin of victory		11,455	1.82	−36.38
Turnout		6,30,805	54.97	−12.34
Registered electors		11,78,258		10.11
BJP gain from TMC(M)		Swing	-14.26	

=== General elections 1996 ===
1996 Indian general election: Tiruchirappalli
Party	Candidate	Votes	%	±%
TMC(M)	L. Adaikalaraj	434,149	62.65	
INC	Dr. K. Gopal	1,69,441	24.45	−39.54
CPI(M)	T. K. Rangarajan	52,185	7.53	−24.10
BJP	D. Dhanabalan	14,778	2.13	−0.01
Independent	N. Sivaprakasam	3,116	0.45	
Margin of victory		2,64,708	38.20	5.83
Turnout		6,92,976	67.31	4.14
Registered electors		10,70,053		1.24
TMC(M) gain from INC		Swing	-1.34	

=== General elections 1991 ===
1991 Indian general election: Tiruchirappalli
Party	Candidate	Votes	%	±%
INC	L. Adaikalaraj	414,628	63.99	2.93
CPI(M)	T. K. Rangarajan	2,04,922	31.63	−5.26
BJP	V. Parthasarathy	13,872	2.14	
JP	G. Fredric	4,280	0.66	
Margin of victory		2,09,706	32.36	8.18
Turnout		6,47,962	63.17	−4.53
Registered electors		10,56,965		0.36
INC hold		Swing	2.93	

=== General Elections 1989 ===
1989 Indian general election: Tiruchirappalli
Party	Candidate	Votes	%	±%
INC	L. Adaikalaraj	429,185	61.06	3.01
CPI(M)	T. K. Rangarajan	2,59,219	36.88	
JP	E. Veluswamy	3,152	0.45	
Margin of victory		1,69,966	24.18	6.50
Turnout		7,02,847	67.70	−8.37
Registered electors		10,53,144		32.40
INC hold		Swing	3.01	

=== General elections 1984 ===
1984 Indian general election: Tiruchirappalli
Party	Candidate	Votes	%	±%
INC	L. Adaikalaraj	337,786	58.05	
DMK	N. Selvaraj	2,34,881	40.37	−13.95
Independent	D. R. Govindaraj	3,115	0.54	
Margin of victory		1,02,905	17.68	3.33
Turnout		5,81,882	76.07	4.13
Registered electors		7,95,398		10.11
INC gain from DMK		Swing	3.73	

=== General Elections 1980 ===
1980 Indian general election: Tiruchirappalli
Party	Candidate	Votes	%	±%
DMK	N. Selvaraj	278,485	54.32	
CPI(M)	T. K. Rangarajan	2,04,886	39.96	
Independent	V. Lalgudi Rajendran	23,133	4.51	
Margin of victory		73,599	14.35	−1.35
Turnout		5,12,709	71.94	3.00
Registered electors		7,22,379		1.37
DMK gain from CPI		Swing	-2.78	

=== General elections 1977 ===
1977 Indian general election: Tiruchirappalli
Party	Candidate	Votes	%	±%
CPI	M. Kalyanasundaram	276,390	57.10	
INC(O)	Y. Venkateswara Dikshidar	2,00,345	41.39	
Independent	A. Lawrence	2,917	0.60	
Independent	M. M. Ismail	2,421	0.50	
Margin of victory		76,045	15.71	11.05
Turnout		4,84,085	68.94	−4.61
Registered electors		7,12,644		14.66
CPI hold		Swing	7.75	

=== General elections 1971 ===
1971 Indian general election: Tiruchirappalli
Party	Candidate	Votes	%	±%
CPI	M. Kalyanasundaram	217,677	49.34	
INC(O)	S. P. Thangavelu	1,97,127	44.69	
CPI(M)	K. Ananda Nambiar	26,339	5.97	
Margin of victory		20,550	4.66	4.03
Turnout		4,41,143	73.55	−3.52
Registered electors		6,21,540		15.73
CPI gain from CPI(M)		Swing	-0.97	

=== General elections 1967 ===
1967 Indian general election: Tiruchirappalli
Party	Candidate	Votes	%	±%
CPI(M)	K. Ananda Nambiar	202,879	50.32	
INC	V. A. Muthiah	2,00,334	49.68	4.74
Margin of victory		2,545	0.63	−2.23
Turnout		4,03,213	77.07	0.48
Registered electors		5,37,064		22.42
CPI(M) gain from CPI		Swing	2.52	

=== General elections 1962 ===
1962 Indian general election: Tiruchirappalli
Party	Candidate	Votes	%	±%
CPI	K. Ananda Nambiar	156,706	47.80	
INC	M. K. M. Abdul Salam	1,47,332	44.94	2.34
Independent	S. S. Subramaniam	23,796	7.26	
Margin of victory		9,374	2.86	−16.20
Turnout		3,27,834	76.60	24.96
Registered electors		4,38,690		5.00
CPI gain from INC		Swing	5.20	

=== General elections 1957 ===
1957 Indian general election: Tiruchirappalli
Party	Candidate	Votes	%	±%
INC	M. K. M. Abdul Salam	91,910	42.60	6.77
CPI	K. Ananda Nambiar	50,785	23.54	
Independent	M. S. Mani	42,161	19.54	
Independent	C. M. Srinivasan	13,804	6.40	
Independent	N. Rukmani	10,765	4.99	
Independent	Rengasami	6,327	2.93	
Margin of victory		41,125	19.06	11.07
Turnout		2,15,752	51.64	−9.11
Registered electors		4,17,789		18.08
INC gain from Independent		Swing	-1.22	

=== General elections 1952 ===
1951–52 Indian general election: Tiruchirappalli
Party	Candidate	Votes	%	±%
Independent	E. Mathuram	94,184	43.82	
INC	N. Halasyam	77,007	35.83	35.83
Independent	T. S. Krishnamoorthi	21,966	10.22	
Socialist Party (India)	M. Nataraja	14,778	6.88	
Independent	A. Nammalwar	7,017	3.26	
Margin of victory		17,177	7.99	
Turnout		2,14,952	60.75	
Registered electors		3,53,822		0.00
Independent win (new seat)				

== See also ==
- Tiruchirapalli
- List of constituencies of the Lok Sabha
