= Dharmalingam =

Dharmalingam may refer to

- Anbil P. Dharmalingam (active from 1962), Indian politician
  - Anbil Dharmalingam Agricultural College and Research Institute in Navalurkottapattu near Tiruchirappalli
- K. Dharmalingam (active from 1991), Indian politician
- P. K. Dharmalingam (1959–2019), Indian cricketer
- Rudi Dharmalingam (born 1981), British actor
- V. Dharmalingam (1918–1985), Sri Lankan politician
- Nagaenthran K. Dharmalingam, Malaysian drug trafficker sentenced to death in Singapore
