= M. Kalyanasundaram =

Indian politician (1909–1988)

Comrade Meenakshisundaram Kalyanasundaram

Member of Madras Legislative Assembly
- In office 1952–1967
- Preceded by: position established
- Succeeded by: R. Nagasundaram
- Constituency: Tiruchirappalli – II

Member of Parliament, Lok Sabha
- In office 1971–1979
- Preceded by: K. Ananda Nambiar
- Succeeded by: N. Selvaraj
- Constituency: Tiruchirappalli

Member of Parliament, Rajya Sabha
- In office 1980–1986
- Prime Minister: Indira Gandhi; Rajiv Gandhi

Secretary, CPI Tamil Nadu State Committee
- In office 1968–1978
- Preceded by: Manali C. Kandasami
- Succeeded by: P. Manickam

Personal details
- Born: 20 October 1909 Kulithalai, Trichinopoly District (now a part of Karur district), Madras Presidency, British India
- Died: 20 June 1988 (aged 78) New Delhi, India
- Party: Communist Party of India
- Spouse: K. Logambal
- Profession: Politician

Meenakshisundaram Kalyanasundaram (20 October 1909 – 20 June 1988) was an Indian politician and former Member of the Legislative Assembly of Tamil Nadu. He was elected to the Tamil Nadu legislative assembly as a Communist Party of India candidate from Tiruchirappalli – II constituency in 1952, 1957 and 1962 elections.

Kalyanasundaram also served as a member of the Lok Sabha from 1971 to 1976 (5th Lok Sabha) and from 1977 to 1979 (6th Lok Sabha), both from Tiruchirappalli parliamentary constituency.

On 6 November 1972, he submitted a memorandum to President of India making allegations against M. Karunanidhi, Chief Minister of Tamil Nadu and against his companion of Ministers of the Dravida Munnetra Kazhagam government which eventually led to the formation of an inquiry commission by a notification dated 3 February 1976 to be headed by Ranjit Singh Sarkaria.

He also represented Tamil Nadu in upper house of India's Parliament the Rajya Sabha from 1980 to 1986. Kalyanasundaram married K. Logambal.
