= Mariamman Temple, Anbil =

Coordinates: 10.8652°N 78.8904°E

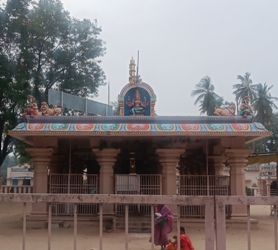
Temple entrance

Mariamman Temple, Anbil, is a Hindu temple located at Anbil, Trichy district, Tamil Nadu, India.

== Presiding deity ==
The presiding deity is swyambu, which known as self made. She is found in stucco figure and also metal.

== Festivals ==
Panchaprakara festival in the Tamil month of Vaikāsi (mid May-mid June), Vidayatri, in Panguni (mid March-mid April) Flower festival, fire pot festival followed by 10 day festival, chariot and other festivals are held. Special pujas are held on New year day, Fridays of Ādi (mid July-mid August), Fridays of Thai, Amavasya and Pournami.
