= S. Senthilkumar =

S. Senthilkumar may refer to:

- S. Senthilkumar (Thiruverumbur politician)
- S. Senthilkumar (Dharmapuri politician)
