= Anbil Mahesh Poyyamozhi =

Indian politician

- Anbil Mahesh in 2024

Minister for School Education Government of Tamil Nadu
- In office 7 May 2021 – 5 May 2026
- Chief Minister: M. K. Stalin
- Preceded by: K. A. Sengottaiyan
- Succeeded by: A. Rajmohan

Member of Tamil Nadu Legislative Assembly
- In office 19 May 2016 – 5 May 2026
- Preceded by: S. Senthilkumar
- Succeeded by: Navalpattu S. Viji
- Constituency: Thiruverumbur

Personal details
- Born: 2 December 1977 (age 48) Anbil, Tiruchirappalli, Tamil nadu India
- Party: Dravida Munnetra Kazhagam
- Spouse: Janani
- Children: 2
- Parents: Anbil Poyyamozhi (father); Malathi (mother)
- Education: Bishop Heber College & ER HSec School, Trichy, Tamil Nadu, India
- Website: http://www.anbilmaheshpoyyamozhi.com/

Anbil Mahesh Poyyamozhi (born 2 December 1977 as "Nallamuththu Poyyamozhi") is an Indian politician who served as the Minister for School Education in Tamil Nadu (2021-2026) and District secretary for Trichy district-South (Trichy east, Thiruverumbur & Manapparai constituencies) of Dravida Munnetra Kazhagam party. He was the Member of Legislative Assembly from 2016–2026. He served as the State Secretary of DMK Youth Wing from 2014–2019.

== Political career ==
He started his political life as a party worker in the year 2000. He was appointed the Youth Wing Secretary in 2014. He was elected as a Member of Tamil Nadu Legislative Assembly from Thiruverumbur constituency in 2016. He was again elected as MLA in May 2021 from the Thiruverumbur constituency consecutively and appointed the School Education Minister of Tamil Nadu. He was nominated by the Dravida Munnetra Kazhagam (DMK) to contest the Thiruverumbur constituency for a third consecutive term in the 2026 Tamil Nadu Legislative Assembly election.

== Education ==
Anbil Mahesh Poyyamozhi completed a doctorate at National College, Tiruchirappalli. His dissertation, titled “Physical Activity for Skill Development Through Machine Learning,” was completed under the guidance of T. Prasanna Balaji.[8]

== Elections contested ==
=== Tamil Nadu Legislative elections ===
Elections	Constituency	Party	Result	Vote percentage	Opposition Candidate	Opposition Party	Opposition vote percentage
2016 Tamil Nadu Legislative Assembly election	Thiruverumbur	DMK	Won	46.98	D. Kalaichelvan	AIADMK	37.85
2021 Tamil Nadu Legislative Assembly election	Thiruverumbur	DMK	Won	53.48	P. Kumar	AIADMK	28.27
2026 Tamil Nadu Legislative Assembly election	Thiruverumbur	DMK	Lost	37.99	N. S. Viji	TVK	42.06
