= M. S. Mani =

M. S. Mani may refer to:

- M. S. Mani (politician), Indian politician
- M. S. Mani (film editor), film director and editor in Malayalam cinema
- Mahadeva Subramania Mani (1908–2003), Indian entomologist
