= M. Selvarasu (Musiri politician) =

Member-Tamil Nadu Legislative Assembly
- In office 2016–2021
- Preceded by: N. R. Sivapathi
- Succeeded by: N. Thiyagarajan
- Constituency: Musiri

Personal details
- Born: 11 May 1966 Vanavandhi
- Party: All India Anna Dravida Munnetra Kazhagam
- Profession: Farmer

M. Selvarasu is an Indian politician and a former member of the Tamil Nadu Legislative Assembly. He is from Vanavandhi in Musiri Taluk, Tiruchirappalli District. Having completed his school education up to the 8th standard, he belongs to the All India Anna Dravida Munnetra Kazhagam (AIADMK) party. He contested and won the Musiri Assembly constituency in the 2016 Tamil Nadu Legislative Assembly election, becoming a Member of Legislative Assembly (MLA).

== Electoral Performance ==
=== 2016 ===
2016 Tamil Nadu Legislative Assembly election: Musiri
Party	Candidate	Votes	%	±%
AIADMK	M. Selvarasu	89,398	52.31%	−2.48
INC	S. Vijaya Babu	57,311	33.53%	+7.78
TMC(M)	M. Rajasekaran	8,581	5.02%	New
NOTA	NOTA	2,485	1.45%	New
NTK	E. Asaithambi	2,446	1.43%	New
PMK	S. Ragavan	1,423	0.83%	New
Independent	T. Chandrasekaran	1,258	0.74%	New
BSP	M. Palanimuthu	1,159	0.68%	New
KMDK	K. Haribaskar	1,063	0.62%	New
Independent	T. K. Ramajayam	879	0.51%	New
Margin of victory		32,087	18.77%	−10.26%
Turnout		170,909	80.37%	−1.18%
Registered electors		212,655		
AIADMK hold		Swing	-2.48%	
