= Tiruchirappalli – I Assembly constituency =

Former constituency in Tamil Nadu, India

Coordinates: 10.834°N 78.686°E

Trichy-I
- Former constituency for the Tamil Nadu Legislative Assembly

Constituency details
- Country: India
- Region: South India
- State: Tamil Nadu
- District: Tiruchirapalli
- Lok Sabha constituency: Tiruchirapalli
- Established: 1951
- Abolished: 2008
- Total electors: 117,649
- Reservation: None

Tiruchirapalli-I is a former state assembly constituency in Tamil Nadu.

== Members of the Legislative Assembly ==
Year	Winner	Party
Madras State
1952	Ramaswamy	Indian National Congress
1957	E. P. Madhuram	Independent
1962	M. S. Mani	Dravida Munnetra Kazhagam
1967	M. S. Mani	Dravida Munnetra Kazhagam
Tamil Nadu
1971	V. Krishnamoorthy	Dravida Munnetra Kazhagam
1977	C. Manickam	All India Anna Dravida Munnetra Kazhagam
1980	P. Musiri Buthan	All India Anna Dravida Munnetra Kazhagam
1984	A. Malarmannan	Dravida Munnetra Kazhagam
1989	A. Malarmannan	Dravida Munnetra Kazhagam
1991	S. Aarokiyasamy	All India Anna Dravida Munnetra Kazhagam
1996	B. Baranikumar	Dravida Munnetra Kazhagam
2001	B. Baranikumar	Dravida Munnetra Kazhagam
2006	Anbil Periasamy	Dravida Munnetra Kazhagam

== Election results ==
Vote share of winning candidates
2006	49.41%
2001	42.93%
1996	63.47%
1991	56.68%
1989	32.19%
1984	50.84%
1980	49.68%
1977	33.29%
1971	52.65%
1967	52.07%
1962	51.37%
1957	51.32%

=== 2006 ===
2006 Tamil Nadu Legislative Assembly election: Tiruchirappalli I
Party	Candidate	Votes	%	±%
DMK	Anbil Periasamy	42,886	49.41%	6.48%
MDMK	A. Malarmannan	32,435	37.37%	25.07%
DMDK	Uma P.	8,151	9.39%	
BJP	Thirumalai R.	1,579	1.82%	
Independent	Ramanan S.	464	0.53%	
Independent	Malarmannan A.	369	0.43%	
Independent	Rafiq Ahamed M.	365	0.42%	
AIFB	Kaliamoorthy S.	191	0.22%	
LJP	Shahul Hameed P. M.	104	0.12%	
Independent	Sakthivel R.	100	0.12%	
	Rengan M.	99	0.11%	
Margin of victory		10,451	12.04%	10.78%
Turnout		86,797	73.78%	16.70%
Registered electors		1,17,649		
DMK hold		Swing	6.48%	

=== 2001 ===
2001 Tamil Nadu Legislative Assembly election: Tiruchirappalli I
Party	Candidate	Votes	%	±%
DMK	B. Baranikumar	31,421	42.93%	−20.54%
IUML	K. M. Kader Mohideen	30,497	41.67%	
MDMK	A. Malarmannan	9,003	12.30%	7.11%
JD(U)	Arumugam. K. C.	802	1.10%	
Independent	Rajamani. K.	418	0.57%	
Independent	Subramanian. R.	387	0.53%	
Independent	Ansari Raja. A.	212	0.29%	
Independent	Thendapani. R.	197	0.27%	
Independent	Selvaraj. S.	145	0.20%	
Independent	Syedbashir Ahamed. S. . G	110	0.15%	
Margin of victory		924	1.26%	−35.08%
Turnout		73,192	57.08%	−7.58%
Registered electors		1,28,234		
DMK hold		Swing	-20.54%	

=== 1996 ===
1996 Tamil Nadu Legislative Assembly election: Tiruchirappalli I
Party	Candidate	Votes	%	±%
DMK	B. Baranikumar	48,045	63.47%	26.58%
AIADMK	Pa. Krishnan	20,535	27.13%	−29.55%
MDMK	A. Malarmannan	3,932	5.19%	
BJP	S. P. Palaniappan	895	1.18%	−0.66%
Independent	N. Nalangkille	831	1.10%	
PMK	S. Samimuthu	312	0.41%	
JP	M. James	88	0.12%	
Independent	M. Uma Maheswari	83	0.11%	
Independent	B. Abdul Azeez	76	0.10%	
Independent	R. Palanisamy	62	0.08%	
Independent	A. R. Nistar Ali	54	0.07%	
Margin of victory		27,510	36.34%	16.55%
Turnout		75,701	64.66%	4.73%
Registered electors		1,20,155		
DMK gain from AIADMK		Swing	6.79%	

=== 1991 ===
1991 Tamil Nadu Legislative Assembly election: Tiruchirappalli I
Party	Candidate	Votes	%	±%
AIADMK	S. Arokiasamy	42,774	56.68%	31.91%
DMK	A. Malarmannan	27,839	36.89%	4.70%
IUML	M. Rajmohamed	2,301	3.05%	
BJP	S. P. Palaniyappan	1,389	1.84%	
JP	A. T. M. Paramasivam	333	0.44%	
Independent	A. Xavier Durairaj	233	0.31%	
Independent	M. Allapitchai	156	0.21%	
Independent	P. Rajarathinam	153	0.20%	
Independent	G. A. Paulraj	82	0.11%	
Independent	A. Kulandaivel	73	0.10%	
Independent	A. K. Mohammed Isaq	46	0.06%	
Margin of victory		14,935	19.79%	12.59%
Turnout		75,471	59.93%	−11.46%
Registered electors		1,29,007		
AIADMK gain from DMK		Swing	24.48%	

=== 1989 ===
1989 Tamil Nadu Legislative Assembly election: Tiruchirappalli I
Party	Candidate	Votes	%	±%
DMK	A. Malarmannan	25,688	32.19%	−18.65%
INC	Shivaraj Ka	19,944	24.99%	−21.95%
AIADMK	Mohamed Ansari A. M	19,763	24.77%	
Independent	Krishnamurthy V. M	7,819	9.80%	
Independent	Srinivasan T. M	5,281	6.62%	
Independent	Murugan P. M	158	0.20%	
Independent	Paul Raj G. A. M	141	0.18%	
Independent	Sekar P. M	102	0.13%	
Independent	Krishnamoorthy R. M	100	0.13%	
Independent	Rajarethinam P. M	94	0.12%	
Independent	Thangaraj K. M	75	0.09%	
Margin of victory		5,744	7.20%	3.31%
Turnout		79,797	71.39%	−2.69%
Registered electors		1,13,240		
DMK hold		Swing	-18.65%	

=== 1984 ===
1984 Tamil Nadu Legislative Assembly election: Tiruchirappalli I
Party	Candidate	Votes	%	±%
DMK	A. Malarmannan	37,802	50.84%	4.22%
INC	Perumal. R.	34,909	46.95%	
Independent	Mohanlal Jain. M.	296	0.40%	
Independent	Sundaram. U.	250	0.34%	
Independent	Paramasivam. M.	232	0.31%	
Independent	Vijayarengan. N.	171	0.23%	
Independent	Vadivelu Pullai. D.	132	0.18%	
Independent	Ramalingam. K.	111	0.15%	
Independent	Subramani. R.	109	0.15%	
Independent	Navaneethan. P.	106	0.14%	
Independent	Selvam. V.	89	0.12%	
Margin of victory		2,893	3.89%	0.83%
Turnout		74,357	74.09%	5.99%
Registered electors		1,03,264		
DMK gain from AIADMK		Swing	1.16%	

=== 1980 ===
1980 Tamil Nadu Legislative Assembly election: Tiruchirappalli I
Party	Candidate	Votes	%	±%
AIADMK	Musiri Putthan. P.	35,361	49.68%	16.38%
DMK	Krishnamurthi. A. V.	33,183	46.62%	16.84%
JP	Subramanian. N.	1,878	2.64%	
Independent	Kathaperumal. P.	565	0.79%	
Independent	Selvanathan. M. J.	195	0.27%	
Margin of victory		2,178	3.06%	−0.45%
Turnout		71,182	68.10%	11.32%
Registered electors		1,05,277		
AIADMK hold		Swing	16.38%	

=== 1977 ===
1977 Tamil Nadu Legislative Assembly election: Tiruchirappalli I
Party	Candidate	Votes	%	±%
AIADMK	C. Manickam	21,908	33.29%	
DMK	A.V. Krishnamurthy	19,597	29.78%	−22.87%
JP	R. Subbian	14,350	21.81%	
INC	M. Palaniyandy	9,759	14.83%	−31.40%
Independent	Raja Alias N.A. Waheed	191	0.29%	
Margin of victory		2,311	3.51%	−2.91%
Turnout		65,805	56.78%	−13.63%
Registered electors		1,16,787		
AIADMK gain from DMK		Swing	-19.36%	

=== 1971 ===
1971 Tamil Nadu Legislative Assembly election: Tiruchirappalli I
Party	Candidate	Votes	%	±%
DMK	Krishnamurthy V.	38,099	52.65%	0.58%
INC	Lourdusamy Pillai A. S. G.	33,450	46.23%	−0.85%
Independent	Murugyah Pillai S.	809	1.12%	
Margin of victory		4,649	6.42%	1.44%
Turnout		72,358	70.42%	−5.29%
Registered electors		1,05,446		
DMK hold		Swing	0.58%	

=== 1967 ===
1967 Madras Legislative Assembly election: Tiruchirappalli I
Party	Candidate	Votes	%	±%
DMK	M. S. Mani	34,504	52.07%	0.70%
INC	A. S. G. L. Piliai	31,199	47.08%	0.39%
ABJS	V. Rengarasan	562	0.85%	
Margin of victory		3,305	4.99%	0.31%
Turnout		66,265	75.70%	−1.10%
Registered electors		89,882		
DMK hold		Swing	0.70%	

=== 1962 ===
1962 Madras Legislative Assembly election: Tiruchirappalli I
Party	Candidate	Votes	%	±%
DMK	M. S. Mani	31,221	51.37%	
INC	E. P. Mathuram	28,379	46.69%	−0.70%
Independent	S. Syed Hussain	1,180	1.94%	
Margin of victory		2,842	4.68%	0.75%
Turnout		60,780	76.81%	27.14%
Registered electors		81,044		
DMK gain from Independent		Swing	0.04%	

=== 1957 ===
1957 Madras Legislative Assembly election: Tiruchirappalli I
Party	Candidate	Votes	%	±%
Independent	E. P. Mathuram	21,022	51.32%	
INC	T. Durairaj Pillai	19,413	47.40%	19.77%
Independent	Dr. M. Raju	525	1.28%	
Margin of victory		1,609	3.93%	−0.40%
Turnout		40,960	49.66%	3.06%
Registered electors		82,474		
Independent gain from INC		Swing	23.70%	

=== 1952 ===
1952 Madras Legislative Assembly election: Tiruchirappalli I
Party	Candidate	Votes	%	±%
INC	Ramasamy	8,710	27.62%	27.62%
Independent	Viyapuri Sholaiyar	7,344	23.29%	
Independent	Duraisamy	6,527	20.70%	
Independent	Dakshnamurthy	5,037	15.97%	
Independent	Avadhani	1,558	4.94%	
Independent	Arumugam	1,506	4.78%	
Independent	Xavier	853	2.70%	
Margin of victory		1,366	4.33%	
Turnout		31,535	46.60%	
Registered electors		67,668		
INC win (new seat)				

== Post delimitation ==
Tiruchirappalli – I (State Assembly Constituency) has been renamed as Tiruchirappalli West after the constituency delimitations 2008.
