= Thiruverumbur Assembly constituency =

One of the 234 State Legislative Assembly Constituencies in Tamil Nadu in India

Coordinates: 10°47′15″N 78°46′35″E

Thiruverumbur
- Constituency No. 142 for the Tamil Nadu Legislative Assembly

Constituency details
- Country: India
- Region: South India
- State: Tamil Nadu
- District: Tiruchirappalli
- Lok Sabha constituency: Tiruchirappalli
- Established: 1971
- Total electors: 2,59,701
- Reservation: None

Member of Legislative Assembly
- 17th Tamil Nadu Legislative Assembly
- Incumbent Vijayakumar (a) Navalpattu S. Viji
- Party: TVK
- Elected year: 2026

Thiruverumbur is a state assembly constituency in Tiruchirappalli district in Tamil Nadu. Its State Assembly Constituency number is 142. It comes under Tiruchirappalli Lok Sabha constituency for Parliament elections. It consists of Thuvakudi Municipality, Thiruverumbur Panchyat Union, and parts of Trichy City Municipal Corporation. Most successful party: DMK (seven times). It is one of the 234 State Legislative Assembly Constituencies in Tamil Nadu.

== Members of Legislative Assembly ==
Year	Member	Political party
1971	Kamatchi	Dravida Munnetra Kazhagam
1977	K. S. Murugesan	Dravida Munnetra Kazhagam
1980	M. Gurusamy alias N. Annadasan	All India Anna Dravida Munnetra Kazhagam
1984	M. Gurusamy alias N. Annadasan	All India Anna Dravida Munnetra Kazhagam
1989	Pappa Umanath	Communist Party of India (Marxist)
1991	T. Rathinavel	All India Anna Dravida Munnetra Kazhagam
1996	K. Durai	Dravida Munnetra Kazhagam
2001	K. N. Sekaran	Dravida Munnetra Kazhagam
2006	K. N. Sekaran	Dravida Munnetra Kazhagam
2011	S. Senthilkumar	Desiya Murpokku Dravida Kazhagam
2016	Anbil Mahesh Poyyamozhi	Dravida Munnetra Kazhagam
2021	Anbil Mahesh Poyyamozhi	Dravida Munnetra Kazhagam
2026	Navalpattu S. Viji	Tamilaga Vettri Kazhagam

== Election results ==
Vote share of winning candidates
2026	42.06%
2021	53.48%
2016	46.98%
2011	47.40%
2006	50.43%
2001	47.30%
1996	62.60%
1991	59.76%
1989	43.67%
1984	47.84%
1980	56.24%
1977	32.06%
1971	53.05%

=== 2026 ===
2026 Tamil Nadu Legislative Assembly election: Thiruverumbur
Party	Candidate	Votes	%	±%
TVK	Navalpattu S. Viji	89,837	42.06	New
DMK	Anbil Mahesh Poyyamozhi	81,132	37.99	▼15.49
AIADMK	Kumar.P	29,473	13.80	▼14.47
NTK	Rajessh.T	9,311	4.36	▼3.61
NOTA	NOTA	745	0.35	▼0.37
Independent	Muruganantham.G	441	0.21	New
Independent	Poulosh.D	291	0.14	New
TVK	Ranjith.S	253	0.12	New
PT	Pitchaimuthu.A	237	0.11	New
Independent	Dr. Mohana Chelvan.P	203	0.10	New
BSP	Visithra.S	194	0.09	New
Independent	Shajagan.A	182	0.09	New
Thamizhaka Padaippalar Makkal Katchi	Kumaravel.T	178	0.08	New
Independent	Vetrivel Kanna.P	173	0.08	New
Independent	Jayachandran.P	133	0.06	New
Samaniya Makkal Nala Katchi	Joseph.L	114	0.05	New
Independent	Deepak.P	114	0.05	New
Independent	Charles.S	101	0.05	New
Independent	Subbulakshmi.R	92	0.04	New
Independent	Yesuraj.I	64	0.03	New
Independent	Vijayakumar.N	54	0.03	New
Independent	Kumar.P	48	0.02	New
Independent	Vijayakumar.C	48	0.02	New
Independent	Ramachandran.V	47	0.02	New
Independent	Habeeb Rahaman.H	44	0.02	New
Independent	Kumar.K	40	0.02	New
Independent	Vincentraj.A	34	0.02	New
Margin of victory		8,705	4.07	▼21.14
Turnout		2,13,583	82.24	▲14.97
Registered electors		2,59,701		▼33,302
TVK gain from DMK		Swing	▲42.06	

=== 2021 ===
2021 Tamil Nadu Legislative Assembly election: Thiruverumbur
Party	Candidate	Votes	%	±%
DMK	Anbil Mahesh Poyyamozhi	105,424	53.48%	+6.51
AIADMK	P. Kumar	55,727	28.27%	−9.58
NTK	V. Cholasooran	15,719	7.97%	+6.14
MNM	M. Muruganandam	14,678	7.45%	New
DMDK	S. Senthilkumar	2,293	1.16%	−6.03
NOTA	NOTA	1,418	0.72%	−0.74
Margin of victory		49,697	25.21%	16.09%
Turnout		197,112	67.27%	−1.25%
Rejected ballots		99	0.05%	
Registered electors		293,003		
DMK hold		Swing	6.51%	

=== 2016 ===
2016 Tamil Nadu Legislative Assembly election: Thiruverumbur
Party	Candidate	Votes	%	±%
DMK	Anbil Mahesh Poyyamozhi	85,950	46.98%	+2.37
AIADMK	D. Kalaichelvan	69,255	37.85%	New
DMDK	S. Senthilkumar	13,155	7.19%	−40.21
NTK	V. Cholasooran	3,353	1.83%	New
BJP	E. Chittibabu	3,144	1.72%	New
NOTA	NOTA	2,676	1.46%	New
PMK	K. Dilipkumar	1,498	0.82%	New
Margin of victory		16,695	9.12%	6.33%
Turnout		182,968	68.53%	−3.37%
Registered electors		267,001		
DMK gain from DMDK		Swing	-0.42%	

=== 2011 ===
2011 Tamil Nadu Legislative Assembly election: Thiruverumbur
Party	Candidate	Votes	%	±%
DMDK	S. Senthilkumar	71,356	47.40%	+38.36
DMK	K. N. Seharan	67,151	44.61%	−5.82
IJK	A. Edwin Jerald	3,688	2.45%	New
Independent	V. Sundarrajan	3,145	2.09%	New
Independent	I. Syed Mohammed Abuthagir	1,885	1.25%	New
BSP	R. Raja	1,212	0.81%	New
Independent	A. Larance	1,083	0.72%	New
Margin of victory		4,205	2.79%	−10.26%
Turnout		150,543	71.89%	0.82%
Registered electors		209,398		
DMDK gain from DMK		Swing	-3.03%	

=== 2006 ===
2006 Tamil Nadu Legislative Assembly election: Thiruverumbur
Party	Candidate	Votes	%	±%
DMK	K. N. Seharan	95,687	50.43%	+3.13
AIADMK	Sridhar Vandayar	70,925	37.38%	New
DMDK	K. Thangamani	17,148	9.04%	New
BJP	N. Parvathi	2,007	1.06%	New
Independent	M. Mayilsamy	1,870	0.99%	New
Independent	S. Muthukumar	979	0.52%	New
Margin of victory		24,762	13.05%	5.04%
Turnout		189,750	71.07%	21.65%
Registered electors		266,993		
DMK hold		Swing	3.13%	

=== 2001 ===
2001 Tamil Nadu Legislative Assembly election: Thiruverumbur
Party	Candidate	Votes	%	±%
DMK	K. N. Sekaran	61,254	47.30%	−15.3
CPI(M)	T. K. Rangarajan	50,881	39.29%	+30.44
MDMK	Thangaraj N	11,562	8.93%	New
Independent	K. Durai	2,074	1.60%	New
Independent	Varatharajan S	901	0.70%	New
Independent	C. Sekar	773	0.60%	New
Margin of victory		10,373	8.01%	−29.18%
Turnout		129,508	49.42%	−11.39%
Registered electors		262,074		
DMK hold		Swing	-15.30%	

=== 1996 ===
1996 Tamil Nadu Legislative Assembly election: Thiruverumbur
Party	Candidate	Votes	%	±%
DMK	K. Durai	78,692	62.60%	New
AIADMK	T. Rathinavel	31,939	25.41%	−34.35
CPI(M)	Mohamed Ali	11,128	8.85%	−28.13
AIIC(T)	G. Rajappa	1,042	0.83%	New
Independent	P. Murugesan	668	0.53%	New
Margin of victory		46,753	37.19%	14.42%
Turnout		125,709	60.81%	4.34%
Registered electors		214,373		
DMK gain from AIADMK		Swing	2.84%	

=== 1991 ===
1991 Tamil Nadu Legislative Assembly election: Thiruverumbur
Party	Candidate	Votes	%	±%
AIADMK	T. Rathinavel	69,596	59.76%	+37.21
CPI(M)	Pappa Umanath	43,074	36.99%	−6.68
BJP	V. Rukmangadhan	1,505	1.29%	New
PMK	K. Gnanasekaran	623	0.53%	New
Margin of victory		26,522	22.77%	5.08%
Turnout		116,460	56.47%	−12.84%
Registered electors		211,377		
AIADMK gain from CPI(M)		Swing	16.09%	

=== 1989 ===
1989 Tamil Nadu Legislative Assembly election: Thiruverumbur
Party	Candidate	Votes	%	±%
CPI(M)	Pappa Umanath	54,814	43.67%	+0.31
INC	V. Swaminathan	32,605	25.98%	New
AIADMK	S. D. Somasundaram	28,300	22.55%	−25.29
AIADMK	M. Annadasan	8,042	6.41%	−41.43
Margin of victory		22,209	17.69%	13.22%
Turnout		125,519	69.31%	−2.15%
Registered electors		184,333		
CPI(M) gain from AIADMK		Swing	-4.17%	

=== 1984 ===
1984 Tamil Nadu Legislative Assembly election: Thiruverumbur
Party	Candidate	Votes	%	±%
AIADMK	M. Guruswamy Alias Annadasan	47,900	47.84%	−8.4
CPI(M)	Pappa Umanath	43,421	43.36%	New
Independent	K. Soundarajan	4,006	4.00%	New
Independent	D. Arumatraj	2,067	2.06%	New
Independent	Karu Anbudasan	549	0.55%	New
Margin of victory		4,479	4.47%	−8.72%
Turnout		100,130	71.47%	2.89%
Registered electors		145,622		
AIADMK hold		Swing	-8.40%	

=== 1980 ===
1980 Tamil Nadu Legislative Assembly election: Thiruverumbur
Party	Candidate	Votes	%	±%
AIADMK	N. Gurusamy Alias Annadasan	51,012	56.24%	New
DMK	K. S. Murugesan	39,047	43.05%	+10.99
Independent	K. Thinakaran	644	0.71%	New
Margin of victory		11,965	13.19%	12.08%
Turnout		90,703	68.58%	4.77%
Registered electors		133,342		
AIADMK gain from DMK		Swing	24.18%	

=== 1977 ===
1977 Tamil Nadu Legislative Assembly election: Thiruverumbur
Party	Candidate	Votes	%	±%
DMK	K. S. Murugesan	24,594	32.06%	−20.99
INC	V. Swaminathan	23,742	30.95%	−16
CPI(M)	K. Ananda Nambiar	18,193	23.72%	New
JP	A. M. Saptharishi Nattar	9,237	12.04%	New
Independent	M. M. Ismail	947	1.23%	New
Margin of victory		852	1.11%	−4.99%
Turnout		76,713	63.81%	−11.25%
Registered electors		121,291		
DMK hold		Swing	-20.99%	

=== 1971 ===
1971 Tamil Nadu Legislative Assembly election: Thiruverumbur
Party	Candidate	Votes	%	±%
DMK	Kamaichi	43,233	53.05%	+9.83
INC	V. Swaminathan	38,258	46.95%	−3.2
Margin of victory		4,975	6.10%	−0.82%
Turnout		81,491	75.05%	−1.21%
Registered electors		112,244		
DMK gain from INC		Swing	2.90%	

=== 1967 ===
1967 Madras Legislative Assembly election: Thiruverumbur
Party	Candidate	Votes	%	±%
INC	V. Swaminathan	33,513	50.15%	New
DMK	K. Kamakshi	28,884	43.22%	New
CPI	A. Velayutham	4,428	6.63%	New
Margin of victory		4,629	6.93%	
Turnout		66,825	76.26%	
Registered electors		92,728		
INC win (new seat)				
