= Gandarvakottai Assembly constituency =

One of the 234 State Legislative Assembly Constituencies in Tamil Nadu, in India

Coordinates: 10.57°N 79.02°E

Gandarvakottai
- Constituency No. 178 for the Tamil Nadu Legislative Assembly

Constituency details
- Country: India
- Region: South India
- State: Tamil Nadu
- District: Pudukottai
- Lok Sabha constituency: Tiruchirappalli
- Established: 1957
- Total electors: 1,96,104
- Reservation: SC

Member of Legislative Assembly
- 17th Tamil Nadu Legislative Assembly
- Incumbent N. Subramanian
- Party: TVK
- Elected year: 2026

Gandarvakottai is a state assembly constituency in Pudukkottai district of Tamil Nadu. It was in existence from 1957 to 1971 state elections, and reappeared after the 2008 delimitation. It is a part of Tiruchirappalli Lok Sabha constituency. It is one of the 234 State Legislative Assembly Constituencies in Tamil Nadu, in India.

== Members of Legislative Assembly ==
Year	Member	Political party
Madras State
1957	R. Krishnasami Gopalar	Indian National Congress
1962	R. Krishnasami Gopalar	Indian National Congress
1967	R. R. Durai	Indian National Congress
Tamil Nadu
1971	Durai Govindarajan	Dravida Munnetra Kazhagam
After delimitation (Note: Gandarvakottai (SC) constituency was formed again after the constituency delimitations in 2008. It is included in Tiruchirappalli Lok Sabha constituency.)
2011	N. Subramanian	All India Anna Dravida Munnetra Kazhagam
2016	B. Arumugam	All India Anna Dravida Munnetra Kazhagam
2021	M. Chinnadurai	Communist Party of India (Marxist)
2026	N. Subramanian	Tamilaga Vettri Kazhagam

== Election results ==
Vote share of winning candidates
2026	35.08%
2021	44.65%
2016	43.84%
2011	54.85%
1971	57.59%
1967	52.68%
1962	41.99%
1957	46.03%

=== 2026 ===
2026 Tamil Nadu Legislative Assembly election: Gandarvakottai
Party	Candidate	Votes	%	±%
TVK	N. Subramanian	58,795	35.08	New
BJP	C. Uthayakumar	47,756	28.49	New
CPI(M)	M. Chinnadurai	46,734	27.88	▼16.77
NTK	Nathiya	10,189	6.08	▼2.03
NOTA	NOTA	1,127	0.67	▼0.22
Independent	Arunkumar.S	653	0.39	New
Independent	Senthilkumar.N	642	0.38	New
Independent	M. Lakshmanan	584	0.35	New
Namadhu Makkal Katchi	Dhanarasu	405	0.24	New
Independent	T. Murugesan	404	0.24	New
Independent	Sasikumar.P	329	0.20	New
Margin of victory		11,039	6.59	▼1.56
Turnout		1,67,618	85.47	▲8.00
Registered electors		1,96,104		▼5,417
TVK gain from CPI(M)		Swing	▲35.08	

=== 2021 ===
2021 Tamil Nadu Legislative Assembly election: Gandarvakottai
Party	Candidate	Votes	%	±%
CPI(M)	M. Chinnadurai	69,710	44.65%	35.12%
AIADMK	S. Jayabharathi	56,989	36.50%	−7.33%
AMMK	P. Lenin	12,840	8.22%	
NTK	M. Ramila	12,661	8.11%	7.13%
NOTA	Nota	1,390	0.89%	−0.17%
CPI(ML)L	P. Asaithambi	1,271	0.81%	0.50%
MNM	Krm. Adhidravidar	848	0.54%	
Margin of victory		12,721	8.15%	6.06%
Turnout		1,56,119	77.47%	−0.69%
Rejected ballots		11	0.01%	
Registered electors		2,01,521		
CPI(M) gain from AIADMK		Swing	0.81%	

=== 2016 ===
2016 Tamil Nadu Legislative Assembly election: Gandarvakottai
Party	Candidate	Votes	%	±%
AIADMK	B. Arumugam	64,043	43.84%	−11.01%
DMK	K. Anbarasan	60,996	41.75%	3.00%
CPI(M)	M. Chinnadurai	13,918	9.53%	
BJP	Puratchikavidhasan @ Palaniyappan. M	1,600	1.10%	
NOTA	None Of The Above	1,556	1.07%	
NTK	C. Mohanraj	1,432	0.98%	
Independent	Chandrasekaran. C	558	0.38%	
PMK	Palanimanickam. M	530	0.36%	
Independent	Veeramuthu. B	514	0.35%	
CPI(ML)L	Vanitha. R	465	0.32%	−0.36%
BSP	Thavamoorthy. T	284	0.19%	−0.68%
Margin of victory		3,047	2.09%	−14.01%
Turnout		1,46,090	78.16%	−1.98%
Registered electors		1,86,922		
AIADMK hold		Swing	-11.01%	

=== 2011 ===
2011 Tamil Nadu Legislative Assembly election: Gandarvakottai
Party	Candidate	Votes	%	±%
AIADMK	N. Subramanian	67,128	54.85%	
DMK	Kavithaipithan. S	47,429	38.76%	
IJK	Selvarani. R	2,974	2.43%	
Independent	Rethinam. V	1,357	1.11%	
BSP	Murugesan. M	1,073	0.88%	
Independent	Bharathy. K	842	0.69%	
CPI(ML)L	Asaithambi. P	824	0.67%	
Independent	Chitra. R	754	0.62%	
Margin of victory		19,699	16.10%	
Turnout		1,52,708	80.14%	
Registered electors		1,22,381		
AIADMK gain from DMK		Swing		

=== 1971 ===
1971 Tamil Nadu Legislative Assembly election: Gandarvakottai
Party	Candidate	Votes	%	±%
DMK	Durai Govindarajan	42,025	57.59%	11.34%
INC	R. Ramachandra Durai	28,239	38.70%	−13.98%
Independent	A. Kaliaperumal	2,705	3.71%	
Margin of victory		13,786	18.89%	12.46%
Turnout		72,969	80.73%	−1.76%
Registered electors		93,352		
DMK gain from INC		Swing	4.91%	

=== 1967 ===
1967 Madras Legislative Assembly election: Gandarvakottai
Party	Candidate	Votes	%	±%
INC	R. R. Durai	34,665	52.68%	10.69%
DMK	D. G. Kalingarar	30,434	46.25%	9.01%
Independent	N. R. Konar	706	1.07%	
Margin of victory		4,231	6.43%	1.67%
Turnout		65,805	82.49%	12.69%
Registered electors		82,264		
INC hold		Swing	10.69%	

=== 1962 ===
1962 Madras Legislative Assembly election: Gandarvakottai
Party	Candidate	Votes	%	±%
INC	R. Krishnaswamy Gopalar	24,878	41.99%	−4.04%
DMK	Govindarasu Kalingarar	22,061	37.24%	
Independent	Ramachandra Dorai	12,308	20.77%	
Margin of victory		2,817	4.75%	−17.35%
Turnout		59,247	69.80%	18.86%
Registered electors		89,012		
INC hold		Swing	-4.04%	

=== 1957 ===
1957 Madras Legislative Assembly election: Gandarvakottai
Party	Candidate	Votes	%	±%
INC	Krishnasami Gopalar	18,928	46.03%	
Independent	Ramachandra Dorai	9,839	23.93%	
Independent	P.S.Thangamuthu Nattar	8,553	20.80%	
Independent	Marimuthu Odayar	1,638	3.98%	
Independent	Dharamaraja Merkondar	1,115	2.71%	
Independent	Rangasami Odayar	1,051	2.56%	
Margin of victory		9,089	22.10%	
Turnout		41,124	50.95%	
Registered electors		80,716		
INC win (new seat)				
