= M. Vignesh =

Indian politician (born 1992)

Member of the Tamil Nadu Legislative Assembly
- Incumbent
- Assumed office 2026
- Constituency: Musiri

Personal details
- Born: 1992 (age 33–34) Lalkudi, Tiruchirappalli district, Tamil Nadu, India
- Party: Tamilaga Vettri Kazhagam
- Occupation: Politician

Muthu Vignesh (born 1992) is an Indian politician from Tamil Nadu. He is a member of the Tamil Nadu Legislative Assembly from the Musiri Assembly constituency, in Tiruchirappalli district, representing the Tamilaga Vettri Kazhagam.

Vignesh is from Lalkudi, Tiruchirappalli district, Tamil Nadu. He is the son of C Muthu. He completed Class 12 in 2010 and later discontinued his studies. He runs his own business and he declared assets worth Rs.97 lakhs in his affidavit to the Election Commission of India.

Vignesh won the Musiri Assembly constituency representing the Tamilaga Vettri Kazhagam in the 2026 Tamil Nadu Legislative Assembly election. He polled 71,281 votes and defeated his nearest rival, N. S. Karunairaaja of the Dravida Munnetra Kazhagam, by a margin of 17,442 votes.
