= M. K. M. Abdul Salam Rowther =

Indian politician

M.K.M. Abdul Salam

Former Member of Parliament
- Constituency: Tiruchirappalli

Personal details
- Born: 26 February 1921 (age 105) Tiruchirappalli, Tamil Nadu
- Party: Indian National Congress
- Spouse: E.A.G. Habibunnisa Begum
- Children: 2 Sons, 1 Daughter

M.K.M. Abdul Salam (born 26 February 1921) was an Indian politician of the Indian National Congress who served as a member of the Lok Sabha from Tiruchirappalli in 1957.

== Early life ==
Shri M.K.M. Abdul Salam was born into wealthy landowning family in Palakarai, Tiruchy in February 26, 1921, son of politician Shri M. K. Mohamed Ibrahim Rowther, he studied at St. Joseph's College, Tiruchirappalli.

== Education ==
Salam studied at St. Joseph's College, Tiruchirappalli.

== Memberships ==
- Vice-President, Tiruchy Municipal Council
- Member, Tiruchy Library Committee
- Vice-President, District Congress Committee
- Ex-Member, Executive Committee, Madras Flying Club
- Member of the Madras Provincial Council from 1952 to 1956.
