= Navalpattu S. Viji =

Indian politician

Navalpattu S. Viji is an Indian politician and member of Tamilaga Vettri Kazhagam (TVK). He is the elected Member of the Legislative Assembly (MLA) for the Thiruverumbur Assembly constituency in Tiruchirappalli district, Tamil Nadu, in the 2026 Tamil Nadu Legislative Assembly election.
