= M. Chinnadurai =

Indian politician

Member of the Tamil Nadu Legislative Assembly
- Incumbent
- Assumed office 12 May 2021
- Preceded by: S. Jayabharathi
- Succeeded by: B. Arumugam
- Constituency: Gandharvakottai

Personal details
- Political party: Communist Party of India (Marxist)

M. Chinnadurai is an Indian politician who is a Member of Legislative Assembly of Tamil Nadu. He was elected from Gandharvakottai as a Communist Party of India (Marxist) candidate in 2021.

== Elections contested ==
Election	Constituency	Party	Result	Vote %	Runner-up	Runner-up Party	Runner-up vote %
2021 Tamil Nadu Legislative Assembly election	Gandharvakottai	CPI(M)	Won	44.65%	S. Jayabharathi	AIADMK	36.50%
2016 Tamil Nadu Legislative Assembly election	Gandharvakottai	CPI(M)	Lost	9.53%	B. Arumugam	AIADMK	43.84%
