= B. Paranikumar =

Indian politician

Balakrishnan Paranikumar, also spelled Baranikumar and Bharani Kumar, is an Indian politician and a former Member of the Legislative Assembly of Tamil Nadu. He was elected to the Tamil Nadu legislative assembly from Tiruchirappalli - I constituency as a Dravida Munnetra Kazhagam (DMK) candidate in the 1996 and 2001 elections. He was not selected as a candidate for the 2006 elections.

Paranikumar is a son of M. Balakrishnan, who died in 2010 and was a significant figure in the DMK and leader of Tiruchirapalli Municipal Council.
