= S. Rathinavelu =

Indian politician

S. Rathinavelu (Anna Dravida Munnetra Kazhagam) is an Indian politician elected as MLA from Musiri constituency, Thiruchirappalli district in 1984. He was an advocate and senior politician. He is familiar person in Muthuraja community among Tamil Nadu.
