= K. Soundararajan =

Indian politician

K. Soundararajan (born 1938), was an Indian politician and former Member of the Legislative Assembly of Tamil Nadu. He was elected to the Tamil Nadu legislative assembly from Tiruchirappalli - II constituency as an Anna Dravida Munnetra Kazhagam candidate in 1977 and 1980 elections.
