= C. Manickam =

Indian politician

C. Manickam is an Indian politician and former Member of the Legislative Assembly of Tamil Nadu. He was elected to the Tamil Nadu Legislative Assembly from Tiruchirappalli - I constituency as an All India Anna Dravida Munnetra Kazhagam candidate in 1977 election.
