= T. V. Sannasi =

Indian politician

Member-Legislative Assembly of Tamil Nadu
- In office 1957–1962
- Preceded by: S. P. Thangavelu
- Succeeded by: S. Ramalingam
- Constituency: Musiri

Personal details
- Born: 7 January 1899
- Party: Indian National Congress
- Profession: Farmer

T. V. Sannasi is an Indian politician and a former Member of the Legislative Assembly (MLA) of Tamil Nadu. He hails from the village of Mettumarudur in the Tiruchirappalli district. Belonging to the Indian National Congress party, he contested and won the Musiri assembly constituency in the 1957 Tamil Nadu Legislative Assembly election, thereby becoming an MLA.

== Electoral performance ==
=== 1957 ===
1957 Madras Legislative Assembly election: Musiri
Party	Candidate	Votes	%	±%
INC	V. A. Muthaiya	34,427	21.73%	−15.66
INC	T. V. Sannasi (Sc)	32,844	20.73%	−16.66
Independent	M. P. Muthukkaruppan	18,657	11.78%	New
Independent	Durairaj (Sc)	18,093	11.42%	New
Independent	A. V. Rengasamy Reddiar	15,936	10.06%	New
CPI	G. Govindarajan	11,543	7.29%	New
CPI	Palaniyandi (Sc)	8,817	5.57%	New
Independent	Singaravelu (Sc)	5,940	3.75%	New
Independent	K. Natesan (Sc)	5,305	3.35%	New
Independent	K. Ganesan	4,206	2.66%	New
Independent	Manickam	2,643	1.67%	New
Margin of victory		1,583	1.00%	−3.84%
Turnout		158,411	99.91%	41.36%
Registered electors		158,561		
INC gain from Independent		Swing	-20.50%	
