= P. S. Muthuselvan =

Indian politician

P. S. Muthuselvan is an Indian politician and former Member of the Legislative Assembly of Tamil Nadu. He was elected to the Tamil Nadu legislative assembly as a Dravida Munnetra Kazhagam candidate from Musiri constituency in the 1967, and 1971 elections.
