= K. Durai =

Indian politician

K. Durai is an Indian politician and was a Member of the Legislative Assembly. He was elected to the Tamil Nadu legislative assembly as a Dravida Munnetra Kazhagam (DMK) candidate from the Thiruverumbur constituency in the 1996 election.

Durai left the DMK in April 2001. He had been denied a party nomination to contest the 2001 assembly elections amidst claims of impropriety, which he denied.
