= K. M. Kader Mohideen =

Indian politician

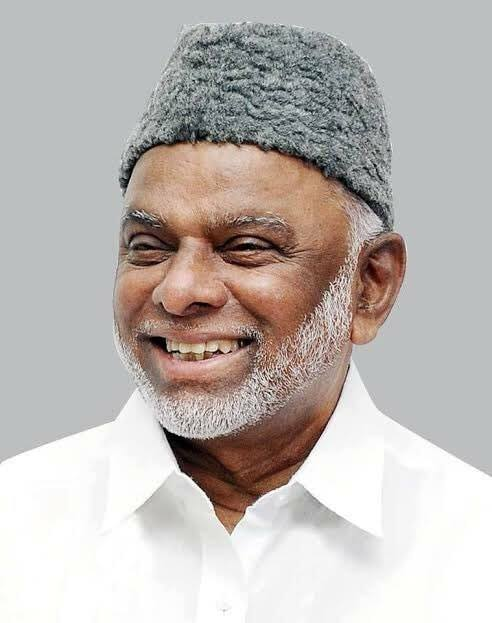
- K. M. Kader Mohideen in 2020

National President, Indian Union Muslim League
- Incumbent
- Assumed office 2017
- Preceded by: E. Ahamed

Member of Parliament
- In office 16 May 2004 – 16 May 2009
- Constituency: Vellore

Personal details
- Born: 5 January 1940 (age 86) Thirunallur, Madras Presidency, British India
- Party: Indian Union Muslim League
- Spouse: G. Latheefa Begum (died in 2019)
- Parents: Mohamed Hanif (father); Kasim Bibi (mother)
- Education: University of Madras

K. Mohamed Kader Mohideen (born 5 January 1940) is an Indian politician and social worker from Tamil Nadu. He currently serves as the National President of the Indian Union Muslim League.

Mohideen represented Vellore Constituency in the Parliament (Lok Sabha) as a Dravida Munnetra Kazhagam (DMK) member in the 14th Lok Sabha (2004—2009). He was selected for prestigious Thagaisal Thamizhar (distinguished Tamil) of the year 2025, which is awarded to honour eminent personalities who have greatly contributed to the welfare of Tamil Nadu and the development of the Tamil community.

== Life and career ==
Mohideen was born to Mohamed Hanif and Kasimbibi at Thirunallur, Pudukkottai District on 5 January 1940. He was educated at University of Madras. Mohideen entered public life with Muslim Students Federation, the student's wing of Indian Union Muslim League.

He also served as Tamil Nadu state President, Indian Union Muslim League.

=== Parliamentary committees ===
- Committee on Home Affairs
- Consultative Committee, Ministry of Power
- Joint Parliamentary Committee on Wakf

=== University Senates ===
- University of Madras, 1977 - 1980
- Standing Committee, Bharathidasan University, Tiruchy, 1980

== Electoral History ==
=== Tamil Nadu Legislative Assembly ===
Year	Constituency	Party	Votes	%	Opponent	Party	Votes	%	Result	Margin	%
1980	Tiruchirappalli–II	IND	34,467	44.48	K. Soundararajan	ADMK	43,029	55.52	Lost	-8,562	-11.04
1989	Tiruchirappalli–II	IND	30,593	30.25	Anbil Poyyamozhi	DMK	40,386	39.93	Lost	-9,793	-9.68
1991	Tiruchirappalli–II	IUML	4,240	4.44	G. R. Mala Selvi	ADMK	54,664	57.18	Lost	-50,424	-52.74
1996	Periyakulam	ADMK	31,520	27.58	L. Mookiah	DMK	53,427	46.75	Lost	-21,907	-19.17
2001	Tiruchirappalli–I	IUML	30,497	41.67	B. Baranikumar	DMK	31,421	42.93	Lost	-924	-1.26
