= M. N. Jothi Kannan =

Indian politician

M. N. Jothi Kannan was elected to the Tamil Nadu Legislative Assembly from the Musiri constituency in the 1996 elections. He was a candidate of the Dravida Munnetra Kazhagam (DMK) party.
