= Anbil Poyyamozhi =

Indian politician

Member of the Tamil Nadu Legislative Assembly

Personal details
- Born: 1954
- Died: 1999 (aged 44–45)
- Party: Dravida Munnetra Kazhagam
- Spouse: Malathi
- Children: 3 including Anbil Mahesh Poyyamozhi
- Parent: Anbil P. Dharmalingam (father)
- Occupation: Politician

Anbil Poyyamozhi was an Indian politician and a former Member of the Legislative Assembly (MLA) of Tamil Nadu. He was a close confidant and friend of former Chief Minister of Tamil Nadu M. K. Stalin.

Poyyamozhi was elected to the Tamil Nadu legislative assembly from Tiruchirappalli - II constituency as a DMK candidate in the 1989 and 1996 elections. He was a son of the former Dravida Munnetra Kazhagam (DMK) minister Anbil P. Dharmalingam and the elder brother of Anbil Periyasamy, who was persuaded to contest the vacant Tiruchirapalli seat in the by-election resulting from Anbil Poyyamozhi's death. Poyyamozhi's son, Anbil Mahesh Poyyamozhi, was elected as the MLA for Thiruverumbur constituency in 2016 and also served as the Minister for School Education in Tamil Nadu from 2021 to 2026.

== Formation of the DMK Youth Wing ==
The DMK Youth Wing was officially launched in 1980 at the Jhansi Rani Park in Madurai. During the second anniversary of the Youth Wing in 1982, held in Tiruchirappalli, a seven-member organizing committee was formed. This committee included both M.K. Stalin and Anbil Poyyamozhi. The team traveled extensively across Tamil Nadu, establishing the Youth Wing at the district, union, and town levels. Stalin was appointed as the State Secretary of the Youth Wing, while Poyyamozhi served as Deputy Secretary. Under Stalin's leadership, the Youth Wing gained significant momentum, and he came to be popularly known as “Thalapathi” (Commander). The headquarters for the Youth Wing was set up at Anbagam, which continues to serve as its base of operations.

== Elections contested ==
=== Tamil Nadu Legislative elections ===
Elections	Constituency	Party
1989 Tamil Nadu Legislative Assembly election	Tiruchirappalli-2	DMK
1996 Tamil Nadu Legislative Assembly election	Tiruchirappalli-2	DMK

Anbil Poyyamozhi was elected as a Member of the Legislative Assembly (MLA) from the Tiruchirappalli–2 constituency in the 1989 and 1996 elections. He also served as the Chairman of the Tiruchirappalli Central Cooperative Bank. He died on August 28, 1999. Mourning his loss, M.K. Stalin stated, “I have not just lost a friend or a brother, I have lost a part of my soul.” This heartfelt tribute reflects the deep impact Poyyamozhi had on Tamil Nadu's political landscape.

== The Third Generation in Politics ==
Following the legacy of Anbil Dharmalingam and Anbil Poyyamozhi, Anbil Mahesh Poyyamozhi has emerged as a prominent figure in the Tiruchirappalli region. Served as the Minister for School Education in Tamil Nadu, Anbil Mahesh upholds the legacy of his grandfather and father through his committed service. He is widely regarded as a pillar of strength for the DMK, commanding respect even from political adversaries.
