= Lalitha Kumaramangalam =

Indian politician

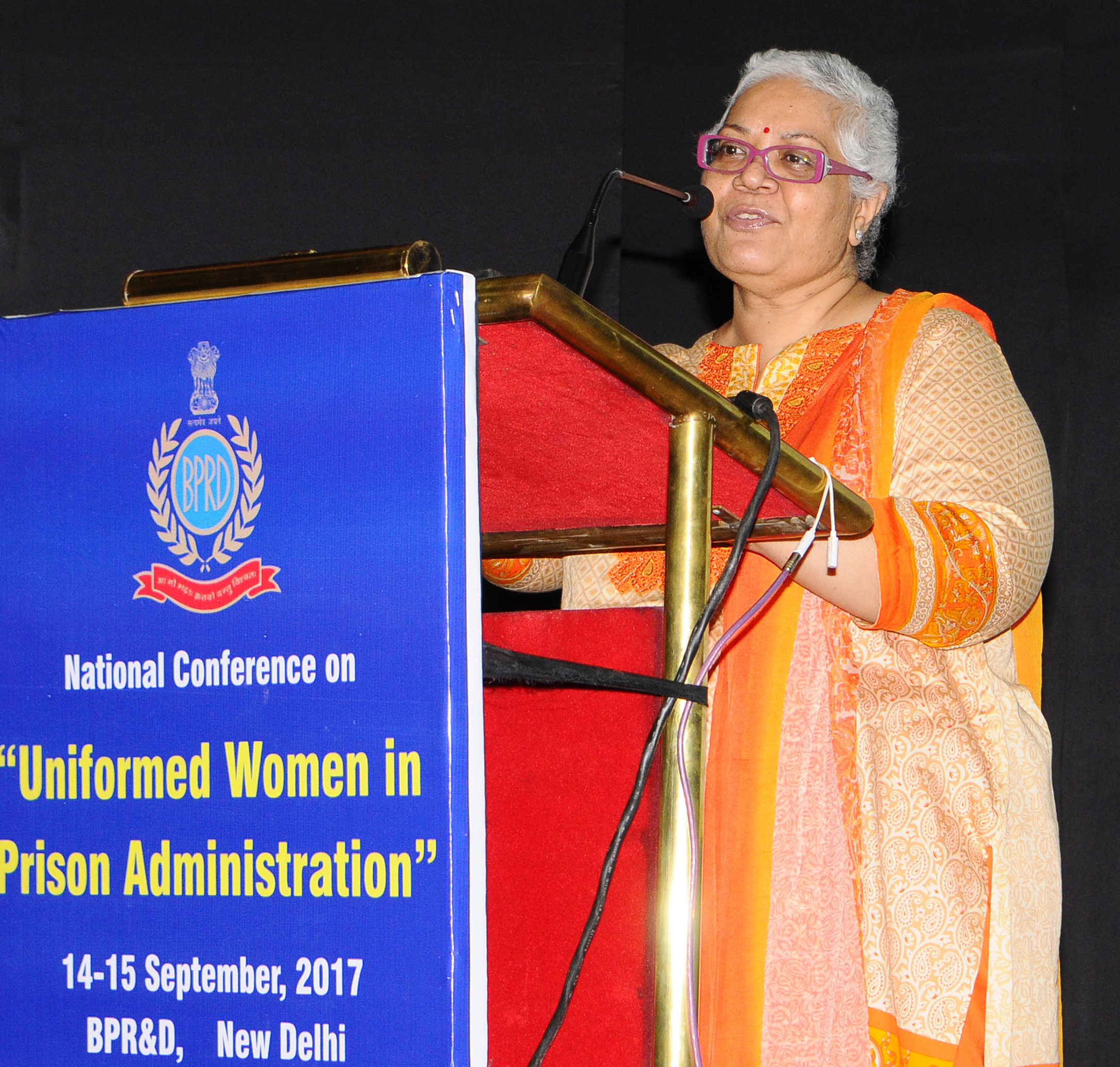
Lalitha Kumaramangalam

Lalitha Kumaramangalam (born 14 January 1958) is an Indian politician who is a member of the Bharatiya Janata Party (BJP) and former chairperson of the National Commission for Women. She was previously the National Secretary of the Bharatiya Janata Party (BJP).

== Family ==
Lalitha Kumaramangalam was born 14 January 1958 in Tamil Nadu, the daughter of Mohan Kumaramangalam, a communist ideologue, politician, and trade union leader. Her paternal grandfather, P. Subbarayan, was the Chief Minister of the Madras Presidency. Her paternal uncle, General P.P. Kumaramangalam, PVSM, DSO, was Chief of the Army Staff of India. Lalitha's mother, Kalyani Mukherjee, was the niece of Ajoy Mukherjee, Chief Minister of West Bengal, and of Biswanath Mukherjee, husband of the communist ideologue and parliamentarian Geeta Mukherjee. Lalitha is the sister of Rangarajan Kumaramangalam, another prominent politician.

== Career ==
Kumaramangalam is a graduate of St. Stephen's College, Delhi, with a degree in economics, and has an MBA from Madras University. She contested Lok Sabha elections twice as BJP candidate (2004 from Puducherry and 2009 from Tiruchirapalli) after her brother's death, but lost on both occasions. She runs an NGO named Prakriti. She was appointed Chairperson of the National Commission for Women on 29 September 2014.

== Elections contested and results ==
Year	Constituency	Result	vote	opponent	vote	margin
2004	Puducherry	Lost	1,72,472	M. Ramadass	2,41,653	69,181
2009	Tiruchirappalli	Lost	30,329	P. Kumar	2,98,710	2,68,381

== See also ==
- Political Families of The World
