= N. Thiyagarajan =

Indian politician

Member of the Tamil Nadu Legislative Assembly
- In office 12 May 2021 – 4 May 2026
- Preceded by: M. Selvarasu
- Constituency: Musiri

Personal details
- Party: Dravida Munnetra Kazhagam

N. Thiyagarajan is an Indian politician who is a Member of Legislative Assembly of Tamil Nadu. He was elected from Musiri as a Dravida Munnetra Kazhagam candidate in 2021.

== Elections contested ==
Election	Constituency	Party	Result	Vote %	Runner-up	Runner-up Party	Runner-up vote %	Ref.
2021 Tamil Nadu Legislative Assembly election	Musiri	DMK	Won	50.43%	M. Selvarasu	ADMK	35.50%	
