= Kumaramangalam kulithalai =

Kumaramangalam is a village in Kulithalai, Karur within the Tamil Nadu district of India. It is situated on the banks of the Kaveri River. The village is also near the Murugan Temple, Mariyamm Temple, Angayee Amman temple and Kavery River as well as the Karur to Trichy National HWY.
