= N. Selvaraj =

Indian politician (1944–2019)

Natesan Selvaraj (May 5, 1944 – March 26, 2019) was an ex Minister and former member of Tamil Nadu legislative assembly representing Dravida Munnetra Kazhagam.

He was elected as the Member of Loksabha in Trichy Parliamentary constituency from (1980–1982) in DMK party.

He was elected from Musiri assembly constituency as the member of legislative assembly in 2006 from DMK party. He also served as the Minister for Forests of Tamil Nadu from (2006-2011) in DMK Government.

He was the District secretary of Trichy district in DMK from 1987–1993.

== Biography ==
He was born in Thuraimangalam on 5 May 1944 to Thiru. A. Natesan and lived in Sasthiri Road First street, Thillainagar, Trichy-18. He was an engineer by profession with a bachelor's degree. He was elected as a member of the Lok Sabha in 1980–84.

Selvaraj contested for DMK in the 2006 Tamil Nadu assembly election and won against ADMK T. P. Punatchi winning by 10,927 votes. He took over the post of Forest Minister then formed DMK government. He was Forest Minister from 2006 till 2011. His achievements include:

1. Increasing numbers of Tigers to 76 from 62 in natural reserves belonging to Tamil Nadu government
2. He was successful in getting sanction for seven bridges across Ayyar river which criss-crosses the constituency. Of them the construction of two bridges had already been completed and the works on three more were in the final stages as of 2011.
3. He brought several roads, bus stands and cement road to holy Samayapuram temple.
4. Announcing Meghamalai as a protected area

He also strove to bring a Zoo into Trichy district. He said "I could not accomplish the task as the approval from National Wildlife Board was not given. If this project is implemented, it would be of boon to the ailing elephants. Moreover, it can be utilised to rejuvenate the elephants by not making them travel long distances to attend rejuvenation camp," to a leading press, Times of India.

Even though he belonged to the majority community from Trichy district, all through his political career he was working for the welfare and development of common people in Trichy district as part of DMK without any community or religious difference. He died on 26 March 2019 at 6.16pm.
