= T. Rathinavel =

Indian politician (born 1951)

T Rathinavel

MP of Rajya Sabha for Tamil Nadu
- Incumbent
- Assumed office 25 July 2013
- Constituency: Tamil Nadu

Personal details
- Political party: AIADMK

T. Rathinavel (born January 1, 1951, in Srivilliputhur, District- Virudhunagar (Tamil Nadu)) is a politician. He is a Member of Parliament, representing Tamil Nadu in the Rajya Sabha (the upper house of India's Parliament).

He belongs to the Indian Anna Dravida Munnetra Kazhagam (ADMK) political party.

== See also ==
- Rajya Sabha members from Tamil Nadu
