= M. S. Mani (politician) =

Indian politician

M. S. Mani was an Indian politician and former Member of the Legislative Assembly of Tamil Nadu. He was elected to the Tamil Nadu legislative assembly from Tiruchirappalli - I constituency as a Dravida Munnetra Kazhagam candidate in 1962 and 1967 elections.
