= A. Malarmannan =

Indian politician

A.Malarmannan
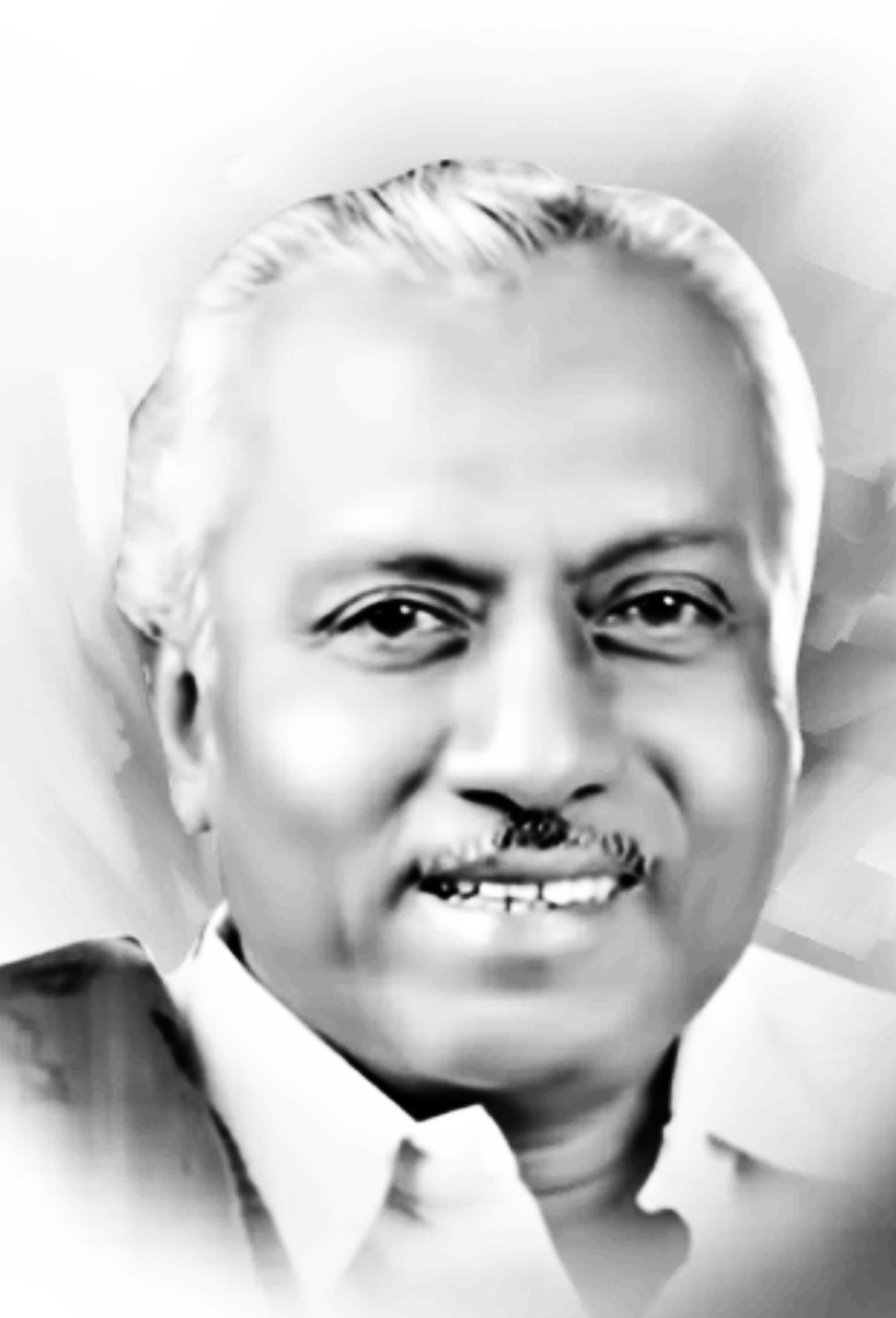

Former Member of the Legislative Assembly

Personal details
- Born: 16 January 1937 Tiruchirappalli
- Died: 18 May 2014 (aged 77) Chennai
- Party: Dravida Munnetra Kazhagam (1960–1993); Marumalarchi Dravida Munnetra Kazhagam (1993–2014)

A. Malarmannan (16 January 1937 – 18 May 2014) was an Indian politician and former Member of the Legislative Assembly of Tamil Nadu.

== Member of Legislative Assembly (MLA) ==
He was elected to the Tamil Nadu Legislative Assembly (MLA) twice from Tiruchirappalli - I constituency as a Dravida Munnetra Kazhagam (DMK) candidate in the year 1984 and 1989.

== Quit DMK and joined MDMK ==
In 1993, Malarmannan was one among senior leaders from the party DMK who walked away with Vaiko and He joined MDMK when Vaiko launched the party Marumalarchi Dravida Munnetra Kazhagam (MDMK). A.Malarmannan continuously held key posts in MDMK.

== Political career ==
Malarmannan was born in 1937 in Tiruchirappalli. He entered into Dravida Munnetra Kazhagam at his early age, inspired by the speech of C. N. Annadurai. from early 1960s he held and participated in various protest for public welfare and In 1976 he was under MISA for protesting against Emergency. He is a close aide of Vaiko and was also close to former Chief Minister Kalaignar Karunanidhi when he was in DMK. And from 1969 to 1983 he held as DMK Tiruchirappalli Nagarmandram President. In 1970s and 80s he also held as DMK State Audit Committee (Tanikkai kulu) Member, Tiruchirappalli City Treasurer and Tiruchirappalli City Secretary in DMK. In addition he was member of several Tamil Nadu Legislative Assembly House Committees, Tiruchirappalli District Merchants Association President, Tiruchirappalli Co-operative Society President, Tiruchirappalli BEL Spin Association President, TSRM Union President and also served as leader for various other Co-operative Organisations and Unions, In 1994 after establishment of MDMK since then he was key leader and Tiruchirappalli District Secretary for 20 years. He also held as MDMK Maanila Araciyal Alocanaikkulu Seyalalar (State Political Advisory Committee Secretary), Maanila Atcimanrakkulu Member (State Administrative Council Member) and party High Command Committee Member. Malarmannan was highly respected by the party members, and had earned the respect and affection of political functionaries cutting across party lines, He gained respect and loyal following due to his leadership, honesty, simplicity and hardwork. He was the one who had proposed Vaiko name as the MDMK's general secretary when the party was formed over two decades ago and at the age of 77 due to illness he died in the Apollo hospital Chennai.

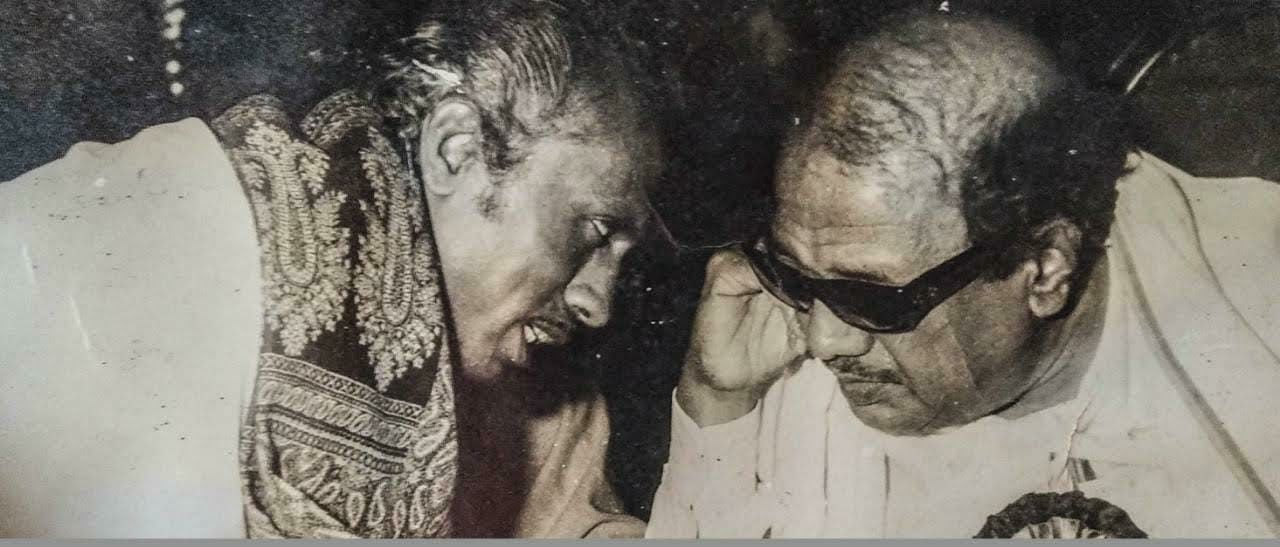
A.Malarmannan at Trichy meeting with Dr.Kalaignar M.Karunanidhi, Chief Minister of Tamil Nadu.
