= Musiri Assembly constituency =

One of the 234 State Legislative Assembly Constituencies in Tamil Nadu, in India

Coordinates: 10.93°N 78.45°E

Musiri
- Constituency No. 145 for the Tamil Nadu Legislative Assembly

Constituency details
- Country: India
- Region: South India
- State: Tamil Nadu
- District: Tiruchirappalli
- Lok Sabha constituency: Perambalur
- Established: 1951
- Total electors: 2,14,146
- Reservation: None

Member of Legislative Assembly
- 17th Tamil Nadu Legislative Assembly
- Incumbent Vignesh.M
- Party: TVK
- Elected year: 2026

Musiri is a legislative assembly constituency in Tiruchirappalli district in the Indian state of Tamil Nadu. Its State Assembly Constituency number is 145. It comes under Perambalur Lok Sabha constituency. It is one of the 234 State Legislative Assembly Constituencies in Tamil Nadu, in India.

== Members of Legislative Assembly ==
=== Madras State ===
Year	Winner	Party
1952	S. P. Thangavelu Muthuraja	Independent
1957	V. A. Muthiah and T. V. Sannasi	Indian National Congress
1962	S. Ramalingam	Indian National Congress
1967	P. S. Muthuselvan	Dravida Munnetra Kazhagam

=== Tamil Nadu ===
Year	Winner	Party
1971	P. S. Muthuselvan	Dravida Munnetra Kazhagam
1977	P. Kothandaraman	All India Anna Dravida Munnetra Kazhagam
1980	M. K. Rajamanickam	All India Anna Dravida Munnetra Kazhagam
1984	S. Rathinavelu	All India Anna Dravida Munnetra Kazhagam
1989	M. Thangavel	All India Anna Dravida Munnetra Kazhagam
1991	M. Thangavel	All India Anna Dravida Munnetra Kazhagam
1996	M. N. Jothi Kannan	Dravida Munnetra Kazhagam
2001	C. Malliga	All India Anna Dravida Munnetra Kazhagam
2006	N. Selvaraj	Dravida Munnetra Kazhagam
2011	N. R. Sivapathi	All India Anna Dravida Munnetra Kazhagam
2016	M. Selvarasu	All India Anna Dravida Munnetra Kazhagam
2021	N. Thiyagarajan	Dravida Munnetra Kazhagam
2026	Vignesh.M	Tamilaga Vettri Kazhagam

== Election results ==
Vote share of winning candidates
2026	37.69%
2021	50.43%
2016	52.31%
2011	54.79%
2006	48.34%
2001	34.83%
1996	51.04%
1991	62.83%
1989	39.05%
1984	59.75%
1980	52.20%
1977	39.27%
1971	54.29%
1967	51.48%
1962	50.79%
1957	21.73%
1952	42.23%

=== 2026 ===
2026 Tamil Nadu Legislative Assembly election: Musiri
Party	Candidate	Votes	%	±%
TVK	Vignesh.M	71,281	37.69	New
DMK	Karunairaaja.N.S	53,839	28.47	▼21.96
AIADMK	Yoganathan.N	52,061	27.52	▼7.98
NTK	G. Bakiyalakshmi	8,357	4.42	▼3.54
NOTA	NOTA	1,093	0.58	▼0.03
PT	Chinnaiyan.M	677	0.36	New
Independent	Loganathan.P M.Sc.M.Phil.	487	0.26	New
Independent	Senthilkumar	308	0.16	New
Samaniya Makkal Nala Katchi	Malarmannan.M	281	0.15	New
TVK	Palanisamy.C	265	0.14	New
Rashtriya Samaj Dal (R)	Dhivya.K	253	0.13	New
ACDP	Venkateshwaran.S	239	0.13	New
Margin of victory		17,442	9.22	▼5.71
Turnout		1,89,141	88.32	▲11.13
Registered electors		2,14,146		▼18,654
TVK gain from DMK		Swing	▲37.69	

=== 2021 ===
2021 Tamil Nadu Legislative Assembly election: Musiri
Party	Candidate	Votes	%	±%
DMK	N. Thiyagarajan	90,624	50.43%	New
AIADMK	M. Selvarasu	63,788	35.50%	−16.81
NTK	Sridevi Ilangovan	14,311	7.96%	+6.53
DMDK	K. S. Kumar	3,182	1.77%	New
MNM	S. Gokul	2,499	1.39%	New
NOTA	NOTA	1,092	0.61%	−0.85
Margin of victory		26,836	14.93%	−3.84%
Turnout		179,706	77.19%	−3.18%
Rejected ballots		139	0.08%	
Registered electors		232,800		
DMK gain from AIADMK		Swing	-1.88%	

=== 2016 ===
2016 Tamil Nadu Legislative Assembly election: Musiri
Party	Candidate	Votes	%	±%
AIADMK	M. Selvarasu	89,398	52.31%	−2.48
INC	S. Vijaya Babu	57,311	33.53%	+7.78
TMC(M)	M. Rajasekharan	8,581	5.02%	New
NOTA	NOTA	2,485	1.45%	New
NTK	E. Asaithambi	2,446	1.43%	New
PMK	S. Ragavan	1,423	0.83%	New
Independent	T. Chandrasekaran	1,258	0.74%	New
BSP	M. Palanimuthu	1,159	0.68%	New
KMDK	K. Haribaskar	1,063	0.62%	New
Independent	T. K. Ramajayam	879	0.51%	New
Margin of victory		32,087	18.77%	−10.26%
Turnout		170,909	80.37%	−1.18%
Registered electors		212,655		
AIADMK hold		Swing	-2.48%	

=== 2011 ===
2011 Tamil Nadu Legislative Assembly election: Musiri
Party	Candidate	Votes	%	±%
AIADMK	N. R. Sivapathi	82,631	54.79%	+13.56
INC	M. Rajasekharan	38,840	25.75%	New
Independent	K. Kannaiyan	19,193	12.73%	New
BJP	S. P. Rajendran	2,743	1.82%	+0.7
Independent	K. Panneerselvam	1,761	1.17%	New
Independent	M. Balakrishnan	1,655	1.10%	New
Independent	P. Tamilselvan	1,350	0.90%	New
Independent	N. M. Neethi Muthu Manal	1,086	0.72%	New
Independent	P. Senthilvel	788	0.52%	New
Margin of victory		43,791	29.04%	21.93%
Turnout		184,922	81.55%	5.85%
Registered electors		150,808		
AIADMK gain from DMK		Swing	6.45%	

=== 2006 ===
2006 Tamil Nadu Legislative Assembly election: Musiri
Party	Candidate	Votes	%	±%
DMK	N. Selvaraj	74,311	48.34%	+14.96
AIADMK	T. P. Poonachi	63,384	41.23%	+6.4
DMDK	M. Rajalingam	10,538	6.86%	New
Independent	S. Viswanathan	2,037	1.33%	New
BJP	C. Nagalingam	1,723	1.12%	New
Margin of victory		10,927	7.11%	5.66%
Turnout		153,726	75.70%	9.50%
Registered electors		203,077		
DMK gain from AIADMK		Swing	13.51%	

=== 2001 ===
2001 Tamil Nadu Legislative Assembly election: Musiri
Party	Candidate	Votes	%	±%
AIADMK	C. Malliga	47,946	34.83%	+4.84
DMK	S. Vivekanandan	45,952	33.38%	−17.66
Independent	M. Thangavel	30,419	22.10%	New
MDMK	R. Natarajan	13,338	9.69%	−6.12
Margin of victory		1,994	1.45%	−19.60%
Turnout		137,655	66.20%	−7.53%
Registered electors		207,941		
AIADMK gain from DMK		Swing	-16.21%	

=== 1996 ===
1996 Tamil Nadu Legislative Assembly election: Musiri
Party	Candidate	Votes	%	±%
DMK	M. N. Jothi Kannan	67,319	51.04%	+15.93
AIADMK	C. Mallika Chinnasamy	39,551	29.99%	−32.84
MDMK	N. Selvaraj	20,848	15.81%	New
Margin of victory		27,768	21.05%	−6.67%
Turnout		131,898	73.73%	11.07%
Registered electors		188,570		
DMK gain from AIADMK		Swing	-11.79%	

=== 1991 ===
1991 Tamil Nadu Legislative Assembly election: Musiri
Party	Candidate	Votes	%	±%
AIADMK	M. Thangavel	70,812	62.83%	+23.78
DMK	R. Natarasan	39,568	35.11%	−2.8
Independent	M. Sivaperumal	584	0.52%	New
{{{party}}}	{{{candidate}}}	{{{votes}}}	{{{percentage}}}	New
Margin of victory		31,244	27.72%	26.57%
Turnout		112,706	62.66%	−16.52%
Registered electors		181,551		
AIADMK hold		Swing	23.78%	

=== 1989 ===
1989 Tamil Nadu Legislative Assembly election: Musiri
Party	Candidate	Votes	%	±%
AIADMK	M. Thangavel	49,275	39.05%	−20.7
DMK	N. Selvaraju	47,826	37.90%	−0.34
INC	R. Ramaraju	18,327	14.53%	New
Independent	S. Subbaiah	8,792	6.97%	New
{{{party}}}	{{{candidate}}}	{{{votes}}}	{{{percentage}}}	New
Margin of victory		1,449	1.15%	−20.36%
Turnout		126,174	79.18%	−1.69%
Registered electors		163,070		
AIADMK hold		Swing	-20.70%	

=== 1984 ===
1984 Tamil Nadu Legislative Assembly election: Musiri
Party	Candidate	Votes	%	±%
AIADMK	S. Rathinavelu	65,759	59.75%	+7.55
DMK	R. Natarajan	42,086	38.24%	−9.56
Margin of victory		23,673	21.51%	17.11%
Turnout		110,054	80.87%	3.49%
Registered electors		143,107		
AIADMK hold		Swing	7.55%	

=== 1980 ===
1980 Tamil Nadu Legislative Assembly election: Musiri
Party	Candidate	Votes	%	±%
AIADMK	M. K. Rajamanickam	53,697	52.20%	+12.93
DMK	R. Natarajan	49,171	47.80%	+24.44
Margin of victory		4,526	4.40%	−11.51%
Turnout		102,868	77.38%	9.71%
Registered electors		135,272		
AIADMK hold		Swing	12.93%	

=== 1977 ===
1977 Tamil Nadu Legislative Assembly election: Musiri
Party	Candidate	Votes	%	±%
AIADMK	P. Kothandarama Alias Musiri Putthan	34,569	39.27%	New
DMK	V. S. Periasamy	20,567	23.36%	−30.92
INC	S. Subbiah	18,925	21.50%	−15.99
JP	P. Ayyakkannu	13,965	15.86%	New
Margin of victory		14,002	15.91%	−0.89%
Turnout		88,026	67.68%	−9.69%
Registered electors		132,057		
AIADMK gain from DMK		Swing	-15.01%	

=== 1971 ===
1971 Tamil Nadu Legislative Assembly election: Musiri
Party	Candidate	Votes	%	±%
DMK	P. S. Muthuselvan	35,091	54.29%	+2.8
INC	A. R. Murugaiah	24,232	37.49%	−6.32
Independent	K. N. Thangavelu	4,479	6.93%	New
Independent	R. Govindarajan	839	1.30%	New
Margin of victory		10,859	16.80%	9.12%
Turnout		64,641	77.37%	−2.39%
Registered electors		89,394		
DMK hold		Swing	2.80%	

=== 1967 ===
1967 Madras Legislative Assembly election: Musiri
Party	Candidate	Votes	%	±%
DMK	P. S. Muthuselvan	32,615	51.48%	+7.79
INC	K. V. K. Reddiar	27,750	43.80%	−6.99
Independent	Rajan	1,589	2.51%	New
ABJS	R. Parthasarthi	737	1.16%	New
Independent	P. S. Govindan	662	1.04%	New
Margin of victory		4,865	7.68%	0.58%
Turnout		63,353	79.76%	6.90%
Registered electors		84,032		
DMK gain from INC		Swing	0.69%	

=== 1962 ===
1962 Madras Legislative Assembly election: Musiri
Party	Candidate	Votes	%	±%
INC	S. Ramalingam	32,155	50.79%	+29.06
DMK	A. Dorairaju	27,661	43.69%	New
Socialist Party (India)	Nagammal	1,845	2.91%	New
Independent	M. Andi Samban	1,649	2.60%	New
Margin of victory		4,494	7.10%	6.10%
Turnout		63,310	72.86%	−27.05%
Registered electors		90,547		
INC hold		Swing	29.06%	

=== 1957 ===
1957 Madras Legislative Assembly election: Musiri
Party	Candidate	Votes	%	±%
INC	V. A. Muthaiya	34,427	21.73%	−15.66
INC	T. V. Sannasi (Sc)	32,844	20.73%	−16.66
Independent	M. P. Muthukkaruppan	18,657	11.78%	New
Independent	Durairaj (Sc)	18,093	11.42%	New
Independent	A. V. Rengasamy Reddiar	15,936	10.06%	New
CPI	G. Govindarajan	11,543	7.29%	New
CPI	Palaniyandi (Sc)	8,817	5.57%	New
Independent	Singaravelu (Sc)	5,940	3.75%	New
Independent	K. Natesan (Sc)	5,305	3.35%	New
Independent	K. Ganesan	4,206	2.66%	New
Independent	Manickam	2,643	1.67%	New
Margin of victory		1,583	1.00%	−3.84%
Turnout		158,411	99.91%	41.36%
Registered electors		158,561		
INC gain from Independent		Swing	-20.50%	

=== 1952 ===
1952 Madras Legislative Assembly election: Musiri
Party	Candidate	Votes	%	±%
Independent	Thangavelu	18,427	42.23%	New
INC	M. P. Krishnaswami	16,316	37.40%	New
Socialist Party (India)	M. S. Narayanaswami	6,285	14.41%	New
Independent	Pichaimuthu	2,602	5.96%	New
Margin of victory		2,111	4.84%	
Turnout		43,630	58.55%	
Registered electors		74,519		
Independent win (new seat)				
