= L. Adaikalaraj =

Indian politician

Former Member of Parliament
- In office 31 December 1984 — 9 March 1998
- Constituency: Tiruchirappalli

Personal details
- Born: 9 May 1936 Tiruchirappalli, Tamil Nadu
- Died: September 27, 2012 (aged 76) Tiruchirappalli
- Party: Indian National Congress
- Spouse: Rani Adaikalaraj

Lourdusamy Adaikalaraj was an Indian politician and former Member of Parliament elected from Tamil Nadu. He was elected to the Lok Sabha from Tiruchirappalli constituency as an Indian National Congress candidate in the 1984, 1989 and 1991 elections and as a Tamil Maanila Congress (Moopanar) candidate in the 1996 election. He died on 27 September 2012, following a heart attack.
