= Rangarajan Kumaramangalam =

Indian politician (1952–2000)

Phanindranath Rangarajan Kumaramangalam
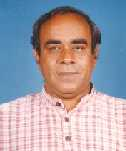
- Rangarajan in 1984

Union Minister of Power
- In office 19 March 1998 – 23 August 2000
- Prime Minister: Atal Bihari Vajpayee
- Deputy: Jayawantiben Mehta
- Preceded by: Yoginder K Alagh
- Succeeded by: Atal Bihari Vajpayee
Additional ministerial positions
Union Minister of Mines and Minerals
In office 6 March 2000 – 27 May 2000
Prime Minister	Atal Bihari Vajpayee
Deputy	Rita Verma
Preceded by	Atal Bihari Vajpayee
Succeeded by	Sukhdev Singh Dhindsa
Union Minister of Law, Justice and Company Affairs
In office 9 April 1999 – 8 June 1999
Prime Minister	Atal Bihari Vajpayee
Preceded by	M. Thambidurai
Succeeded by	Ram Jethmalani
Union Minister of Non-Conventional Energy Sources
In office 3 February 1999 – 13 October 1999
Prime Minister	Atal Bihari Vajpayee
Preceded by	Atal Bihari Vajpayee
Succeeded by	M. Kannappan
Union Minister of Parliamentary Affairs
In office 30 January 1999 – 13 October 1999
Prime Minister	Atal Bihari Vajpayee
Deputy	Ram Naik (until May'1999); Dilip Ray; Santosh Kumar Gangwar (from Feb'1999); Mukhtar Abbas Naqvi (from Feb'1999)
Preceded by	Madan Lal Khurana
Succeeded by	Pramod Mahajan

Union Minister of State for Parliamentary Affairs
- In office 21 June 1991 – 2 December 1993
- Prime Minister: P. V. Narasimha Rao
- Minister: Ghulam Nabi Azad; Vidya Charan Shukla
- Preceded by: M. M. Jacob
- Succeeded by: Abrar Ahmed

Member of Parliament, Lok Sabha
- In office 3 March 1998 – 23 August 2000
- Preceded by: L. Adaikalaraj
- Succeeded by: Dalit Ezhilmalai
- Constituency: Tiruchirapalli
- In office 30 December 1984 — 10 May 1996
- Preceded by: C. Palaniappan
- Succeeded by: R. Devadass
- Constituency: Salem

Personal details
- Born: 12 May 1952
- Died: 23 August 2000 (aged 48) New Delhi
- Party: BJP (1997–2000)
- Other political affiliations: INC (1973–1995); IC(T) (1995-1997)
- Spouse: Kitty Kumaramangalam
- Children: Rangarajan Mohan; Ruchira
- Parents: Mohan Kumaramangalam (father); Kalyani Mukherjee (mother)
- Relatives: Lalitha Kumaramangalam (sister); P. Subbarayan (grandfather); P. P. Kumaramangalam (uncle); Ajoy Mukherjee (granduncle)
- Education: Kirori Mal College

Phanindranath Rangarajan Kumaramangalam (12 May 1952 – 23 August 2000) was a prominent politician of the Indian National Congress and later the Bharatiya Janata Party and a Member of parliament, Lok Sabha from the Salem constituency from 1984 to 1996 and Tiruchirapalli constituency from 1998 to 2000. He served as the Minister of State for Law, Justice and Company Affairs in the P. V. Narasimha Rao government from July 1991 to December 1993 and as the Union Minister for Power in the Vajpayee government from 1998 to 2000. He was the grandson of former Chief Minister of Madras, P. Subbarayan and the nephew of former Indian Chief of Army, General P. P. Kumaramangalam.

== Personal life ==
Rangarajan was born on 12 May 1952 in the Zamindari family of Kumaramangalam, in Tiruchengode Taluk, Namakkal District. His grandfather Paramasiva Subbarayan was the Chief Minister (Premier) of the then Madras presidency from 1925 to 1930 and a Cabinet Minister under later governments. His uncle, General P. P. Kumaramangalam was a veteran of the Second World War and a former Chief of Army Staff. Rangarajan's father Mohan Kumaramangalam was an important theorist and organiser of the undivided Communist Party of India and later switched to Indian National Congress influenced by the socialist policies of then Prime Minister Indira Gandhi and served as Union Cabinet Minister for Steel & Mines in her cabinet. His mother Kalyani Mukherjee was the niece of Ajoy Mukherjee, Chief Minister of West Bengal, and of Biswanath Mukherjee, husband of the communist ideologue and parliamentarian Geeta Mukherjee.

== Politics ==
Ranga was deeply involved in student politics right from early in life, as one of the founding members and the first president of the National Students Union of India (NSUI). It was no less a person than Prime Minister Indira Gandhi, whose great personal favourite he was, who called him to take up this post after going through due process. By 1973, he had also been elected a member of the All India Congress Committee. In 1977, on obtaining a degree from Kirori Mal College, Delhi University, he moved to Madras to practice in labour law. When the Congress was re-elected in 1980, Rangarajan was asked by his very dear friend, soon-to-be-Prime Minister Rajiv Gandhi, to play an active role in politics. He contested and won the 1984 elections from Salem Lok Sabha constituency.

P.V. Narasimha Rao appointed him Minister of State for Law, Justice and Company Affairs in July 1991. Despite his personal sense of loyalty to Narasimha Rao, Ranga was unable to support him in what was increasingly being seen as a corrupt Congress regime. In a letter to the President he raised several issues with regards to corruption allegedly perpetrated by the Prime Minister, based on documents he had in his possession and that formed the basis of the Vohra Committee report. In this letter he asked the President to ask the Prime Minister to step down and face an investigation against the charges.

In late 1993, Rangarajan resigned as Cabinet Minister. In May 1995, Rangarajan resigned from the primary membership of the Indian National Congress and along with Arjun Singh, N.D. Tiwari, Sheila Dikshit and others, founded the Congress(T). However, Rangarajan lost his seat in the 1996 Parliamentary elections during which his new party suffered a crushing defeat. In December 1997, Rangarajan joined the Bharatiya Janata Party. He won from the Tiruchirapalli Lok Sabha constituency in 1998 and 1999 and became one of the torch-bearers of the BJP in Tamil Nadu. He served with distinction as the Union Minister for Power and Parliamentary Affairs, holding additional charge of Law, Justice and Company Affairs, and Mines, in the Second Vajpayee Ministry from 1998 to 1999 and in the Third Vajpayee Ministry from 1999 until his death in 2000.

== Death ==
Rangarajan died on 23 August 2000 at the All India Institute of Medical Sciences at the age of 48 as a result of acute myeloid leukaemia (blood cancer). At the time of his death, he was the Power Minister in the then A. B. Vajpayee ministry. He was cremated with full state honours on the same day.

== See also ==
- Political Families of The World
