= Tiruchirappalli – II Assembly constituency =

Coordinates: 10.754°N 78.693°E

Tiruchirappalli - II
- Former constituency for the Tamil Nadu Legislative Assembly

Constituency details
- Country: India
- Region: South India
- State: Tamil Nadu
- District: Tiruchirappalli
- Lok Sabha constituency: Tiruchirappalli
- Established: 1951
- Abolished: 2008
- Reservation: None

Tiruchirapalli-II was a state assembly constituency in Tamil Nadu.

== Members of the Legislative Assembly ==
Year	Winner	Party
Madras State
1952	M. Kalyanasundaram	Communist Party of India
1957	M. Kalyanasundaram	Communist Party of India
1962	M. Kalyanasundaram	Communist Party of India
1967	R. Nagasundaram	Dravida Munnetra Kazhagam
Tamil Nadu
1971	Anbil P. Dharmalingam	Dravida Munnetra Kazhagam
1977	K. Soundararajan	All India Anna Dravida Munnetra Kazhagam
1980	K. Soundararajan	All India Anna Dravida Munnetra Kazhagam
1984	N. Nallusamy	All India Anna Dravida Munnetra Kazhagam
1989	Anbil Poyyamozhi	Dravida Munnetra Kazhagam
1991	G. R. Mala Selvi	All India Anna Dravida Munnetra Kazhagam
1996	Anbil Poyyamozhi	Dravida Munnetra Kazhagam
2000^	Anbil Periyasamy	Dravida Munnetra Kazhagam
2001	Anbil Periyasamy	Dravida Munnetra Kazhagam
2006	K. N. Nehru	Dravida Munnetra Kazhagam

== Election results ==
Vote share of winning candidates
2006	49.37%
2001	52.06%
1996	68.24%
1991	57.18%
1989	39.93%
1984	51.63%
1980	55.52%
1977	36.37%
1971	55.74%
1967	46.08%
1962	55.71%
1957	43.28%
1952	58.86%

=== 2006 ===
2006 Tamil Nadu Legislative Assembly election: Tiruchirappalli II
Party	Candidate	Votes	%	±%
DMK	K. N. Nehru	74,026	49.37%	−2.69%
AIADMK	M. Mariam Pichai	57,394	38.28%	
DMDK	Sendhureswaran A. D.	14,027	9.36%	
BJP	Mathiarasan M.	2,413	1.61%	
BSP	Elangovan R.	642	0.43%	
Independent	Raja Mohamed A.	536	0.36%	
Independent	Ravichandran M.	289	0.19%	
	Balakrishnan K.	184	0.12%	
Independent	Mohan D.	154	0.10%	
Independent	Murugan T.	154	0.10%	
Independent	Muralidharan S.	112	0.07%	
Margin of victory		16,632	11.09%	−1.73%
Turnout		1,49,931	70.98%	17.07%
Registered electors		2,11,217		
DMK hold		Swing	-2.69%	

=== 2001 ===
2001 Tamil Nadu Legislative Assembly election: Tiruchirappalli II
Party	Candidate	Votes	%	±%
DMK	Anbil Periyasamy	56,598	52.06%	−16.18%
INC	Selvaraj P. C.	42,654	39.23%	
MDMK	C. Kannaiyan	7,289	6.70%	
Independent	Ramanan . S	789	0.73%	
JP	Varatharaj . L	510	0.47%	
GMK	Maruthamuthu . T	508	0.47%	
Independent	Selvaraj . A	367	0.34%	
Margin of victory		13,944	12.83%	−30.23%
Turnout		1,08,715	53.92%	−5.24%
Registered electors		2,04,762		
DMK hold		Swing	-16.18%	

=== 1996 ===
1996 Tamil Nadu Legislative Assembly election: Tiruchirappalli II
Party	Candidate	Votes	%	±%
DMK	Anbil Poyyamozhi	71,058	68.24%	32.55%
AIADMK	Selvaraj P.	26,229	25.19%	−31.99%
CPI(M)	Vijayalakshmi G.	3,849	3.70%	
BJP	Sriram K.	1,724	1.66%	0.34%
Independent	Nagendran P.	134	0.13%	
Independent	Iliyasraja	115	0.11%	
Independent	Ajisdeen Basha J.	106	0.10%	
Independent	Venkataraman K.	90	0.09%	
Independent	Selvaraj S.	89	0.09%	
Independent	Chidambaram P.	89	0.09%	
Independent	Veerasami S.	84	0.08%	
Margin of victory		44,829	43.05%	21.56%
Turnout		1,04,123	59.16%	4.70%
Registered electors		1,80,447		
DMK gain from AIADMK		Swing	11.06%	

=== 1991 ===
1991 Tamil Nadu Legislative Assembly election: Tiruchirappalli II
Party	Candidate	Votes	%	±%
AIADMK	Mala Selvi G. R.	54,664	57.18%	47.90%
DMK	Anbil Poyyamozhi	34,120	35.69%	−4.24%
IUML	K. M. Kader Mohideen	4,240	4.44%	
BJP	Dev Ananth K. S.	1,259	1.32%	0.11%
JP	Velusamy E.	591	0.62%	
Independent	Masthan	213	0.22%	
Independent	Karuppiah M.	104	0.11%	
Independent	Andul Rahman M.	64	0.07%	
THMM	Nadarajan V.	63	0.07%	
Independent	Sirajudeen N.	59	0.06%	
Independent	Murugaiah Pillai	56	0.06%	
Margin of victory		20,544	21.49%	11.81%
Turnout		95,597	54.46%	−12.24%
Registered electors		1,80,072		
AIADMK gain from DMK		Swing	17.25%	

=== 1989 ===
1989 Tamil Nadu Legislative Assembly election: Tiruchirappalli II
Party	Candidate	Votes	%	±%
DMK	Anbil Poyyamozhi	40,386	39.93%	−6.51%
Independent	K. M. Kader Mohideen	30,593	30.25%	
Independent	Velusamy E. M	18,324	18.12%	
AIADMK	K. Soundararajan	9,383	9.28%	−42.35%
BJP	Venkatachari K. K. M	1,218	1.20%	
Independent	Tajudeen E. M. M	144	0.14%	
Independent	Murlidharan V. M	127	0.13%	
Independent	Selvaraj G. M	121	0.12%	
Independent	Radhakrishnan P. M	121	0.12%	
Independent	Kalibhullah V. M	114	0.11%	
Independent	Ramamoorthy V. M	109	0.11%	
Margin of victory		9,793	9.68%	4.50%
Turnout		1,01,137	66.69%	−4.00%
Registered electors		1,54,172		
DMK gain from AIADMK		Swing	-11.70%	

=== 1984 ===
1984 Tamil Nadu Legislative Assembly election: Tiruchirappalli II
Party	Candidate	Votes	%	±%
AIADMK	N. Nallusamy	46,589	51.63%	−3.90%
DMK	Anbil P. Dharmalingam	41,908	46.44%	
Independent	A. G. L. Irudayaraj	625	0.69%	
Independent	P. Balu	356	0.39%	
Independent	M. J. Selvanathan	183	0.20%	
Independent	K. A. Jeganathan	153	0.17%	
Independent	M. K. Shanmugam	130	0.14%	
Independent	N. Ravi	128	0.14%	
Independent	M. Periyasamy	108	0.12%	
Independent	P. Ponnusamy	61	0.07%	
Margin of victory		4,681	5.19%	−5.86%
Turnout		90,241	70.70%	8.45%
Registered electors		1,31,240		
AIADMK hold		Swing	-3.90%	

=== 1980 ===
1980 Tamil Nadu Legislative Assembly election: Tiruchirappalli II
Party	Candidate	Votes	%	±%
AIADMK	K. Soundararajan	43,029	55.52%	19.15%
Independent	K. M. Kader Mohideen	34,467	44.48%	
Margin of victory		8,562	11.05%	−0.24%
Turnout		77,496	62.24%	5.56%
Registered electors		1,25,957		
AIADMK hold		Swing	19.15%	

=== 1977 ===
1977 Tamil Nadu Legislative Assembly election : Tiruchirappalli II
Party	Candidate	Votes	%	±%
AIADMK	K. Soundararajan	25,405	36.37%	
DMK	M.S. Venkatachalam	17,523	25.09%	−30.65%
JP	N. Krishnan	16,841	24.11%	
CPI	M. Ganam	9,681	13.86%	
Independent	S. Rathinam	400	0.57%	
Margin of victory		7,882	11.28%	−1.48%
Turnout		69,850	56.68%	−10.18%
Registered electors		1,24,230		
AIADMK gain from DMK		Swing	-19.37%	

=== 1971 ===
1971 Tamil Nadu Legislative Assembly election: Tiruchirappalli II
Party	Candidate	Votes	%	±%
DMK	Anbil P. Dharmalingam	40,593	55.74%	9.66%
INC	Subramanian	31,295	42.97%	9.64%
Independent	Abass S. M. M.	586	0.80%	
Independent	Sheriff Rowther	355	0.49%	
Margin of victory		9,298	12.77%	0.02%
Turnout		72,829	66.86%	−4.30%
Registered electors		1,12,812		
DMK hold		Swing	9.66%	

=== 1967 ===
1967 Madras Legislative Assembly election: Tiruchirappalli II
Party	Candidate	Votes	%	±%
DMK	R. Nagasundaram	26,048	46.08%	
INC	M. K. M. A. Salam	18,842	33.33%	−10.96%
CPI	M. Kalyanasundaram	11,638	20.59%	
Margin of victory		7,206	12.75%	1.33%
Turnout		56,528	71.16%	−1.66%
Registered electors		83,269		
DMK gain from CPI		Swing	-9.63%	

=== 1962 ===
1962 Madras Legislative Assembly election: Tiruchirappalli II
Party	Candidate	Votes	%	±%
CPI	M. Kalyanasundaram	38,281	55.71%	
INC	T. N. Rajendran	30,436	44.29%	8.38%
Margin of victory		7,845	11.42%	4.04%
Turnout		68,717	72.82%	24.07%
Registered electors		96,249		
CPI hold		Swing	12.42%	

=== 1957 ===
1957 Madras Legislative Assembly election: Tiruchirappalli Ii
Party	Candidate	Votes	%	±%
CPI	M. Kalyanasundaram	19,026	43.28%	
INC	Subburethinam	15,784	35.91%	2.34%
Independent	K. Kamatchi	9,147	20.81%	
Margin of victory		3,242	7.38%	−17.92%
Turnout		43,957	48.75%	−16.08%
Registered electors		90,160		
CPI hold		Swing	-15.58%	

=== 1952 ===
1952 Madras Legislative Assembly election: Tiruchirappalli II
Party	Candidate	Votes	%	±%
CPI	M. Kalyanasundaram	31,508	58.86%	
INC	G. Ramaswami	17,969	33.57%	33.57%
Independent	Iruthasami	2,729	5.10%	
Independent	Natarajan	406	0.76%	
Independent	Balasubramanian	367	0.69%	
SP	P. R. Ramaswamy	320	0.60%	
Independent	Usman	233	0.44%	
Margin of victory		13,539	25.29%	
Turnout		53,532	64.83%	
Registered electors		82,573		
CPI win (new seat)				

== Post delimitation ==
Tiruchirappalli – II (State Assembly Constituency) has been renamed as Tiruchirappalli East after the constituency delimitations 2008.
