= Anbil Periyasamy =

Indian politician

Anbil Periyasamy is an Indian politician and former Member of the Legislative Assembly of Tamil Nadu.

He is the son of former DMK Minister Anbil P. Dharmalingam and younger brother of Anbil Poyyamozhi.

He was elected to the Tamil Nadu legislative assembly from Tiruchirappalli - II constituency as a Dravida Munnetra Kazhagam candidate in 1999–2000 by-election and 2001 election and from Tiruchirappalli - I constituency as a Dravida Munnetra Kazhagam candidate in 2006 election.
