= K. Ananda Nambiar =

Indian politician

K. Ananda Nambiar (1918 – 11 October 1991) was an Indian politician of the Communist Party of India who served as a member of the Lok Sabha from Mayiladuthurai and Tiruchirapalli. He was the first communist to be elected to a State Legislature.

== Politics ==
In 1946, Nambiar stood for election to the Madras Legislative Assembly as a candidate of the Communist Party of India and was elected. He served as a member of the Madras Legislative Assembly from 1946 to 1951. He participated in the 1951 Lok Sabha elections as a candidate from Mayiladuthurai and was elected. He served as the Member of Parliament for Mayiladuthurai or Mayuram from 1951 to 1957 and Tiruchirapalli from 1962 to 1971.

== Death ==
Nambiar died on 11 October 1991 at Tiruchirapalli after a heart attack.
