= Anbil Dharmalingam Agricultural College and Research Institute =

Coordinates: 10.753779°N 78.602414°E

- Type: Public
- Established: 1989
- Students: 750
- Location: Thiruchirappalli, Tamil Nadu, India
- Campus: Suburb
- Affiliations: Tamil Nadu Agricultural University
- Website: www.tnau.ac.in/agtry/index.html

Anbil Dharmalingam Agricultural College and Research Institute is an agricultural college at Navalur Kuttappattu village near Tiruchirappalli. It is part of the Tamil Nadu Agricultural University. It offers undergraduate degree in agriculture.

It is named after a former DMK politician Anbil Dharmalingam.

== Departments ==
The Departments in university college.

Department of agronomy Department of soil science and agricultural chemistry Department of plant breeding and genetics Department of plant Protection Department of Social Science

== Research centre ==
Kumaraperumal Farm Science Centre - Soil Salinity Research Centre

== Location ==
It is located on Tiruchirapalli Dindigul Highway Road at Navalur Kuttappattu near Tiruchirappalli.
