= S. Senthilkumar (Thiruverumbur politician) =

Indian politician

S. Senthilkumar is an Indian politician and a former member of the Tamil Nadu Legislative Assembly from the Thiruverumbur constituency. He represents the Desiya Murpokku Dravida Kazhagam party.
