= P. Kumar =

Indian attorney and politician

P.Kumar ப.குமார்
- Punalkulam

Member of Parliament, Lok Sabha
- In office May 2009 — May 2019
- Constituency: Tiruchirappalli

Personal details
- Born: Palanivel Kumar; 21 April 1971 (age 55) Punalkulam, Pudukkottai district, India
- Party: All India Anna Dravida Munnetra Kazhagam
- Children: P. K. Mukesh Kumar
- Education: B.sc.BL

Palanivel Kumar (born 21 April 1971) is an Indian politician. He is popularly known as 'ப.குமார்', member of the Parliament of India from Tiruchirappalli constituency since 2009. He represents AIADMK.

== Personal life ==
He was born in Pudukkottai district, Gandarvakkottai taluk, Punalkulam, Tamil Nadu. He is the son of Palanivel and Muniyammal. He has one son and a daughter.

== Politics ==
He joined AIADMK in 1991. In 2009 he was nominated to participate in the Lok Sabha election.

In February 2014 he was re-nominated for the Lok Sabha seat for Tiruchirappalli. In 2018 he was appointed AIADMK trichy urban secretary and served as state youth wing secretary for five years. He is Deputy Leader in Lok Sabha for AIADMK. In the 2014 Lok Sabha election he defeated Mu. Anbhalagan.

He is known for his organising abilities. He was called district secretary "of trichy AIADMK.

=== Elections ===
Year	Constituency	Party affiliation	Result
2009	Tiruchirappalli	All India Anna Dravida Munnetra Kazhagam	Won
2014	Tiruchirappalli	All India Anna Dravida Munnetra Kazhagam	Won
