= Anbil P. Dharmalingam =

Indian politician

- Born: 1919
- Died: 1993 (aged 73–74)
- Title: founder member of Dravida Munnetra Kazhagam
- Political party: Dravida Munnetra Kazhagam
- Children: Anbil Poyyamozhi, Anbil Rajendran, Anbil Periyasamy, Rani

Anbil P. Dharmalingam was a politician from the Indian state of Tamil Nadu and founder member of Dravida Munnetra Kazhagam. The Anbil Dharmalingam Agricultural College and Research Institute is named after him.

== Politics ==
Anbil Dharmalingam was one of the founder-members of the Dravida Munnetra Kazhagam (DMK).

When the DMK was elected to power in 1967, Dharmalingam served as the Minister for Local Administration and Agriculture various times.

At a rally held in North Arcot district on 7 and 8 April 1973 in which Dharmalingam and five other Ministers presided, he declared that formation of an independent Tamil Nadu was the aim of the DMK.

== Electoral records ==
He was elected to the Tamil Nadu legislative assembly as a Dravida Munnetra Kazhagam candidate from Lalgudi constituency in 1962 and 1980 elections and from Tiruchirappalli - II constituency in 1971 election.

== Family & Death ==
Anbil Dharmalingam died in 1993. His sons Anbil Periyasamy and Anbil Poyyamozhi have been members of Dravida Munnetra Kazhagam and have served in the Tamil Nadu legislative assembly.
