= List of political parties in India =

India has a multi-party system, and the Election Commission of India (ECI) grants recognition to national-level and state-level political parties based on objective criteria. A recognised political party enjoys privileges such as a reserved party symbol, (Note: If a party was recognised as a national or state party, its symbol is reserved for its exclusive use in the country or in the state.) free broadcast time on state-run television and radio, consultation in deciding election dates, and giving input in setting electoral rules and regulations. Other political parties wishing to contest local, state, or national elections must be registered with the ECI. Registered parties can be upgraded to recognized national or state parties by the ECI if they meet the relevant criteria after a Lok Sabha or state legislative assembly election. The ECI periodically reviews the recognized party status.

Before the amendment in 2016 (which came into force on 1 January 2014), if a political party failed to fulfill the criteria in the subsequent Lok Sabha or state legislative assembly election, it would lose its status as a recognized party. In 2016, the ECI announced that a periodic review would take place after two consecutive elections instead of after every election. Therefore, a political party will retain its recognized party status even if it does not meet the criteria in the next election. However, if it fails to meet the criteria in the election following the next one, it would lose its status.

As per latest publications dated 23 March 2024 from Election Commission of India, and subsequent notifications, there are 6 national parties, 60 state parties, (Note: There were 60 state parties listed in publication issued by the Election Commission of India on 23 March 2024. However, two out of 60 parties (Rashtriya Lok Samta Party and People's Democratic Front) have merged with other parties. Additionally, the name and symbol of Lok Janshakti Party and Jammu and Kashmir National Panthers Party have been frozen due to dispute. In January 2025, Janasena Party was recognised as a state party. Naam Tamilar Katchi was recognised as a state party in May 2025.) and 2,049 registered unrecognized parties (RUPP) in India. All registered parties contesting elections need to choose a symbol from a list of available symbols offered by the ECI. All 29 states of the country and the union territories of Jammu and Kashmir, National Capital Territory of Delhi, and Puducherry have elected legislatures unless President's rule is imposed under certain conditions.

== National parties ==
=== Criteria for recognition ===
A registered party is recognised as a national party only if it fulfills any one of the three conditions listed below:

- If its candidates have secured at least 6% of total valid votes in at least 4 states (in latest Lok Sabha or Assembly elections) and the party has at least 4 MPs in the last Lok Sabha polls.
- If it has won at least 2% of the total seats in the Lok Sabha from at least 3 states.
- It is 'recognised' in four or more states. (Note: The criteria for getting recognised as “state party” are listed later.)

=== List of National parties ===
Recognised national parties
Aam Aadmi Party		Bahujan Samaj Party		Bharatiya Janata Party	
Founded		Founded		Founded	
26 November 2012 (13 years ago)		14 April 1984 (42 years ago)		6 April 1980 (46 years ago)	
Flag		Flag		Flag	
Electoral Symbol		Electoral Symbol		Electoral Symbol	
Political Position		Political Position		Political Position	
Centre		Centre-left		Right-wing to far-right	
Ideology		Ideology		Ideology	
Populism; Secularism; Nationalism		Ambedkarism; Social justice		Hindutva; Right-wing populism Conservatism; Neo-liberalism; Neo-fascism	
Leader		Leader		Leader	
Arvind Kejriwal		Mayawati		Nitin Nabin	
Number of Elected Representatives		Number of Elected Representatives		Number of Elected Representatives	
Lok Sabha	Rajya Sabha	Lok Sabha	Rajya Sabha	Lok Sabha	Rajya Sabha
3 / 543	3 / 245	0 / 543	0 / 245	241 / 543	118 / 245
State Assemblies	State Councils	State Assemblies	State Councils	State Assemblies	State Councils
121 / 4,123	0 / 426	3 / 4,123	0 / 426	1,812 / 4,123	174 / 426
Communist Party of India (Marxist)		Indian National Congress		National People's Party	
Founded		Founded		Founded	
7 December 1964 (61 years ago)		28 December 1885 (140 years ago)		6 January 2013 (13 years ago)	
Flag		Flag		Flag	
Electoral Symbol		Electoral Symbol		Electoral Symbol	
Political Position		Political Position		Political Position	
Left-wing		Centre		Centre-right	
Ideology		Ideology		Ideology	
Marxism-Leninism; Socialism; Secularism; Revolutionary patriotism Anti-imperialism		Civic nationalism Secularism; Liberalism; Social democracy		Conservatism; Regionalism	
Leader		Leader		Leader	
Marian Alexander Baby		Mallikarjun Kharge		Conrad Sangma	
Number of Elected Representatives		Number of Elected Representatives		Number of Elected Representatives	
Lok Sabha	Rajya Sabha	Lok Sabha	Rajya Sabha	Lok Sabha	Rajya Sabha
4 / 543	3 / 245	98 / 543	29 / 245	0 / 543	1 / 245
State Assemblies	State Councils	State Assemblies	State Councils	State Assemblies	State Councils
43 / 4,123	0 / 426	632 / 4,123	60 / 426	49 / 4,123	0 / 426

== State parties ==
=== Criteria for recognition ===
A registered party is recognised as a state party only if it fulfils any one of the five conditions listed below:

- A party should secure at least six per cent of valid votes polled in an election to the state legislative assembly and win at least two seats in that state assembly.
- A party should secure at least six per cent of valid votes polled in an election to Lok Sabha and win at least one seat in Lok Sabha.
- A party should win at least three per cent of the total number of seats or any fraction thereof allotted to that state.
- At least one MP for every 25 members or any fraction allotted to the state in the Lok Sabha.
- Under the liberalised criteria, one more clause that it will be eligible for recognition as state party if it secures eight per cent or more of the total valid votes polled in the state.

=== List of state parties ===
Recognised state parties
Party	Flag	Election symbol	Founded	Leader(s)	Recognised in state(s)	Number of seats			
Party	Flag	Election symbol	Founded	Leader(s)	Recognised in state(s)	Lok Sabha of 543	Rajya Sabha of 245	State assemblies of 4123	State councils of 426
State party in three states
Communist Party of India			1925	D. Raja	Kerala; Manipur; Tamil Nadu	2	2	22	1
Janata Dal (Secular)			1999	H. D. Deve Gowda; H. D. Kumaraswamy	Arunachal Pradesh; Karnataka; Kerala	2	1	18	8
Janata Dal (United)			2003	Nitish Kumar	Arunachal Pradesh; Bihar; Manipur	12	4	87	26
Nationalist Congress Party			1999	Sunetra Pawar	Maharashtra; Nagaland; Arunachal Pradesh	1	3	44	8
All India Trinamool Congress (Note: The All India Trinamool Congress is subject to an ongoing dispute between rival factions over its name and election symbol. The Election Commission of India has temporarily frozen the original name and symbol pending resolution of the dispute.)			1998	Mamata Banerjee	Meghalaya; Tripura; West Bengal	8	9	(Note: Legislative strength is not listed separately pending resolution of the dispute over the party's name and election symbol.)	0
State party in two states
All India Anna Dravida Munnetra Kazhagam		Two Leaves	1972	Edappadi K. Palaniswami	Puducherry; Tamil Nadu	0	4	42	0
Dravida Munnetra Kazhagam			1949	M. K. Stalin	Puducherry; Tamil Nadu	22	10	59	0
Naga People's Front			1963	Neiphiu Rio	Manipur; Nagaland	0	0	39	0
Nationalist Congress Party – Sharadchandra Pawar			2024	Sharad Pawar	Maharashtra; Nagaland	8	2	12	3
Rashtriya Janata Dal			1997	Lalu Prasad Yadav; Tejashwi Yadav	Bihar; Jharkhand	4	5	81	5
Telugu Desam Party			1982	N. Chandrababu Naidu	Andhra Pradesh; Telangana	16	2	135	10
YSR Congress Party			2011	Y. S. Jagan Mohan Reddy	Andhra Pradesh; Telangana	4	7	11	35
Tamilaga Vettri Kazhagam			2024	C. Joseph Vijay	Puducherry; Tamil Nadu	0	0	111	0
State party in one state
All India Forward Bloc			1939	Debabrata Biswas	West Bengal	0	0	0	0
All India Majlis-e-Ittehadul Muslimeen		kite	1927	Asaduddin Owaisi	Telangana	1	0	10	2
All India N.R. Congress			2011	N. Rangaswamy	Puducherry	0	0	10	0
All India United Democratic Front			2005	Badruddin Ajmal	Assam	0	0	15	0
All Jharkhand Students Union			1986	Sudesh Mahto	Jharkhand	1	0	1	0
Apna Dal (Soneylal)			2016	Anupriya Patel	Uttar Pradesh	2	0	12	1
Asom Gana Parishad			1985	Atul Bora	Assam	0	1	9	0
Bharat Adivasi Party			2023	Rajkumar Roat	Rajasthan	1	0	5	0
Bharat Rashtra Samithi			2001	K. Chandrashekar Rao	Telangana	0	4	39	19
Biju Janata Dal			1997	Naveen Patnaik	Odisha	0	7	51	0
Bodoland People's Front			2005	Hagrama Mohilary	Assam	0	0	3	0
Citizen Action Party – Sikkim			2023	Ganesh Kumar Rai	Sikkim				
Communist Party of India (Marxist–Leninist) Liberation			1974	Dipankar Bhattacharya	Bihar	2	0	13	1
Desiya Murpokku Dravida Kazhagam			2005	Premallatha Vijayakant	Tamil Nadu	0	0	0	0
Goa Forward Party			2016	Vijai Sardesai	Goa	0	0	1	0
Hill State People's Democratic Party			1968	KP Pangniang	Meghalaya	0	0	2	0
Indian National Lok Dal			1996	Abhay Singh Chautala	Haryana	0	0	2	0
Indian Union Muslim League			1948	Sadiq Ali Shihab Thangal	Kerala	3	2	24	0
Indigenous People's Front of Tripura			2009	Prem Kumar Reang	Tripura	0	0	1	0
Jammu & Kashmir National Conference			1932	Farooq Abdullah; Omar Abdullah	Jammu and Kashmir	2	3	42	0
Jammu and Kashmir National Panthers Party			1982	Harsh Dev Singh	Jammu and Kashmir	0	0	0	0
Jammu and Kashmir Peoples Democratic Party			1999	Mehbooba Mufti	Jammu and Kashmir	0	0	3	0
Janasena Party			2014	Pawan Kalyan	Andhra Pradesh	2	0	21	2
Jannayak Janta Party			2018	Dushyant Chautala	Haryana	0	0	0	0
Janta Congress Chhattisgarh			2016	Renu Jogi	Chhattisgarh	0	0	0	0
Jharkhand Mukti Morcha			1972	Hemant Soren	Jharkhand	3	2	34	0
Kerala Congress			1964	P. J. Joseph	Kerala	1	0	7	0
Kerala Congress (M)			1979	Jose K. Mani	Kerala	0	1	0	0
Lok Janshakti Party (Ram Vilas)			2021	Chirag Paswan	Bihar	5	0	3	0
Maharashtra Navnirman Sena			2006	Raj Thackeray	Maharashtra	0	0	0	0
Maharashtrawadi Gomantak Party			1963	Deepak Dhavalikar	Goa	0	0	2	0
Naam Tamilar Katchi			1958	Seeman	Tamil Nadu	0	0	0	0
Mizo National Front			1961	Zoramthanga	Mizoram	0	0	10	0
People's Party of Arunachal			1977	Kamen Ringu	Arunachal Pradesh	0	0	1	0
Rashtriya Lok Janshakti Party			2021	Pashupati Kumar Paras	Bihar	0	0	0	0
Rashtriya Loktantrik Party			2018	Hanuman Beniwal	Rajasthan	1	0	0	0
Revolutionary Goans Party			2022	Viresh Borkar	Goa	0	0	1	0
Revolutionary Socialist Party			1940	Manoj Bhattacharya	Kerala	1	0	3	0
Samajwadi Party			1992	Akhilesh Yadav	Uttar Pradesh	37	4	112	9
Shiromani Akali Dal			1920	Sukhbir Singh Badal	Punjab	1	0	3	0
Sikkim Democratic Front			1993	Pawan Kumar Chamling	Sikkim	0	0	0	0
Sikkim Krantikari Morcha			2013	Prem Singh Tamang	Sikkim	1	0	32	0
Shiv Sena			2022	Eknath Shinde	Maharashtra	7	1	59	8
Shiv Sena (UBT)			2022	Uddhav Thackeray	Maharashtra	9	2	20	6
Tipra Motha Party			2019	Pradyot Bikram Manikya Deb Barma	Tripura	0	0	13	0
United Democratic Party			1997	Metbah Lyngdoh	Meghalaya	0	0	11	0
United People's Party Liberal			2015	Urkhao Gwra Brahma	Assam	1	1	7	0
Voice of the People Party			2021	Ardent Miller Basaiawmoit	Meghalaya	1	0	4	0
Zoram Nationalist Party			1997	H. Lalrinmawia	Mizoram	0	0	0	0
Zoram People's Movement			2017	Lalduhoma	Mizoram	1	1	27	0

== Unrecognised parties ==
Notable registered unrecognised political parties (RUPPs)
Party	Founded	Leader(s)	States
Akhil Bharat Hindu Mahasabha	1915	Chakrapani	All-India
All India Hindustan Congress Party	2015	Buddh Prakash Sharma	Gujarat; Rajasthan
All India Mahila Empowerment Party	2017	Nowhera Shaik	Telangana; Karnataka
Amma Makkal Munnetra Kazhagam	2018	T. T. V. Dhinakaran	Tamil Nadu
Amra Bangali	1983	Prabhat Ranjan Sarkar	West Bengal; Tripura
Azad Adhikar Sena	2022	Amitabh Thakur, Nutan Thakur	Uttar Pradesh
Aazad Samaj Party (Kanshi Ram)	2020	Chanda Shekhar Azad	Uttar Pradesh
Bahujan Mukti Party	2012	Pravendra Pratap Singh	Uttar Pradesh; Maharashtra
Bharatiya Minorities Suraksha Mahasangh	1983	Sundar Shaekhar	Maharashtra
Democratic Trinamool Congress	2026	Ritabrata Banerjee	West Bengal
Gorkha Janmukti Morcha	2007	Bimal Gurung	West Bengal
Goa Suraksha Manch	2016	Subhash Velingkar	Goa
Gondwana Ganatantra Party	1991	Tuleshwar Hira Singh Markam	Chhattisgarh; Jharkhand; Maharashtra
Hindu Sena	2011	Vishnu Gupta	New Delhi
Hindustani Awam Morcha (Secular)	2015	Jitan Ram Manjhi	Bihar
Indiya Jananayaka Katchi	2010	T. R. Paarivendhar	Tamil Nadu
Indian Gandhiyan Party	2012	Aashin U S	Kerala
Indian Secular Front	2021	Naushad Siddiqui	West Bengal
Ittehad-e-Millat Council	2001	Tawqir Raza Khan	Uttar Pradesh
Jammu and Kashmir Apni Party	2020	Altaf Bukhari	Jammu and Kashmir
Jammu and Kashmir Workers Party	2020	Mir Junaid	Jammu and Kashmir
Jan Shakti Party of India	2015	Gurjeet Singh Azad	Punjab
Jansatta Dal (Loktantrik)	2018	Raghuraj Pratap Singh	Uttar Pradesh
Jan Suraaj Party	2024	Prashant Kishor	Bihar
Jharkhand Loktantrik Krantikari Morcha	2024	Jairam Kumar Mahato	Jharkhand
Karnataka Rashtra Samithi	2019	Ravi Krishna Reddy	Karnataka
Kerala Congress (B)	1989	K. B. Ganesh Kumar	Kerala
Kerala Congress (Jacob)	1991	Anoop Jacob	Kerala
Kongunadu Makkal Desia Katchi	2013	E. R. Eswaran	Tamil Nadu
Kongunadu Makkal Katchi	2000	A. M. Raja	Tamil Nadu
Lok Satta Party	2006	Jaya Prakash Narayana	Andhra Pradesh; Telangana
Lok Insaaf Party	2019	Simarjit Singh Bains	Punjab
Makkal Needhi Maiam	2018	Kamal Haasan	Tamil Nadu; Puducherry
Mamata All India Trinamool Congress	2026	Mamata Banerjee	West Bengal; Meghalaya; Assam
Manipur Peoples Party	1968	Sovakiran N.	Manipur
Manithaneya Makkal Katchi	2009	M. H. Jawahirullah	Tamil Nadu
Marumalarchi Dravida Munnetra Kazhagam	1992	Vaiko	Tamil Nadu
NISHAD Party	2016	Sanjay Nishad	Uttar Pradesh
Odisha Jan Morcha	2013	Pyarimohan Mohapatra	Odisha
Param Digvijay Dal	2014	Krishna Mohan Shankar Yogi	Uttar Pradesh
Pattali Makkal Katchi	1989	S. Ramadoss	Puducherry; Tamil Nadu
Peace Party	2008	Mohamed Ayub	Uttar Pradesh
People's Democratic Alliance	2012	Bd. Behring Anal	Manipur
People's Democratic Front	2001	Ajoy Biswas	Tripura
Plurals Party	2020	Pushpam Priya Choudhary	Bihar
Puthiya Tamilagam	1996	K. Krishnasamy	Tamil Nadu
Raijor Dal	2020	Akhil Gogoi	Assam
Rashtriya Lok Dal	1996	Jayant Chaudhary	Uttar Pradesh; Rajasthan
Rashtriya Lok Morcha	2023	Upendra Kushwaha	Bihar
Rashtriya Samaj Paksha	2003	Mahadev Jankar	Maharashtra; Kerala
Rashtriya Ulama Council	2008	Aamir Rashadi Madni	Uttar Pradesh
Republican Party of India (Athawale)	1999	Ramdas Athawale	Manipur
Samata Party	1994	Uday Mandal	Bihar; Manipur
Shiromani Akali Dal (Amritsar)	1994	Simranjit Singh Mann	Punjab
Social Democratic Party of India	2009	M. K. Faizy	Karnataka; Kerala; Tamil Nadu
Socialist Party	2011	Thampan Thomas	Uttar Pradesh
Socialist Unity Centre of India	1948	Provash Ghosh	All-India
Suheldev Bharatiya Samaj Party	2002	Om Prakash Rajbhar	Uttar Pradesh
Swaraj India	2016	Yogendra Yadav	Haryana; Karnataka; Maharashtra
Tamil Maanila Congress (Moopanar)	1996	G. K. Vasan	Tamil Nadu
Tamil Nadu Kongu Ilaingar Peravai	2001	U. Thaniyarasu	Tamil Nadu
Twenty 20 Party	2015	Sabu M. Jacob	Kerala
Uttarakhand Kranti Dal	1979	Kashi Singh Airy	Uttarakhand
Vanchit Bahujan Aaghadi	2018	Prakash Yashwant Ambedkar	Maharashtra
Viduthalai Chiruthaigal Katchi	1990	Thol. Thirumavalavan	Tamil Nadu
Vikassheel Insaan Party	2018	Mukesh Sahani	Bihar
Welfare Party of India	2011	S. Q. R. Ilyas	Kerala

== Historical parties ==
Party	Flag	Election symbol	Leader(s)	State(s)	Ideology	Founded	Dissolved
Krishak Sramik Party			A. K. Fazlul Haq		Populism	1929	1947
Scheduled Castes Federation			Dr. B. R. Ambedkar		Social equality Social justice	1942	1957
Travancore Tamil Nadu Congress			A. Nesamony			1945	1957
Socialist Party of India			Jaya Prakash Narayan		Socialism	1948	1952
Lok Sewak Sangh						1948	1971
Akhil Bharatiya Ram Rajya Parishad			Swami Karpatri		Hindu nationalism	1948	1971
All India Ganatantra Parishad			Rajendra Narayana Singh Deo		Liberalism; Agrarianism	1950	1962
Tamil Nadu Toilers' Party						1951	1954
Commonweal Party						1951	1954
People's Democratic Front					Communism; Marxism–Leninism	1951	1958
Krishikar Lok Party			N. G. Ranga			1951	1959
Chota Nagpur Santhal Parganas Janata Party					Regionalism	1951	1960
Bharatiya Jana Sangh		Diya, a traditional oil lamp, was the symbol of the party	Shyamaprasad Mukherjee		Hindu nationalism National conservatism	1951	1977
Praja Socialist Party			J. B. Kripalani		Socialism	1952	1972
Swatantra Party			Chakravarti Rajagopalachari		Liberal conservatism Secularism	1959	1974
Samyukta Socialist Party			George Fernandes		Socialism	1964	1977
Bangla Congress			Ajoy Mukherjee			1967	1971
Bharatiya Kranti Dal			Charan Singh			1967	1974
Utkal Congress			Biju Patnaik			1969	1974
Syndicate Congress			K. Kamaraj			1969	1977
Pragati Legislature Party			Biju Patnaik			1973	1974
Congress for Democracy			Jagjivan Ram			1977	1977
Janata Party (Secular) or Dalit Mazdoor Kisan Party or Lokdal			Charan Singh		Secularism	1979 (JPE-S), 1984 (DMKP), 1980, 1985 (LD)	1988
Indian Congress (Socialist)			Sarat Chandra Sinha			1978	1986
Indian National Congress (U)			D. Devaraj Urs			1979	1981
Indian National Congress (Jagjivan)			Jagjivan Ram			1981	1988
Jan Morcha			V. P. Singh			1987	1988
Thamizhaga Munnetra Munnani			Sivaji Ganesan			1988	1989
Janata Dal			V. P. Singh			1988	1999
Lok Shakti			Ramakrishna Hegde			1998	2003
Lok Janshakti Party			Ramvilas Paswan			2000	2021
Jan Adhikar Party (Loktantrik)			Pappu Yadav			2015	2024
Nationalist Democratic Progressive Party			Neiphiu Rio			2018	2025
Makkal Desiya Murpokku Dravida Kazhagam			V.C. Chandhirakumar	Tamil Nadu		2016	2025

== See also ==
- Lists of political parties
- List of communist parties in India
- List of Indian National Congress breakaway parties
- Labour Party (India)
- Conservatism in India
