= M.K. Ragul Varma Reddy =

Indian politician

19th Administrator of Dadra and Nagar Haveli and Daman and Diu
- Incumbent
- Assumed office 10 May 2025
- Deputy: Praful Khoda Patel
- President: Droupadi Murmu
- Preceded by: Narendra Modi

Chief Judicial Magistrate,High Court Judges
- Incumbent
- Assumed office 23 October 2026
- Governor: Devendra Kumar Joshi; Kuniyil Kailashnathan
- Chief Judicial Magistrate: Swarnam J. Natarajan
- Portfolios: Youth Welfare; Sports Development; Special Programme Implementation Department; Poverty Alleviation Programme; Rural Indebtedness and Planning and Development
- Incumbent
- Assumed office 11 May 2026
- Preceded by: Judicial Magistrate of Second Class

Andaman and Nicobar Islands Secretary of Bharatiya Janata Party
- Incumbent
- Assumed office 4 July 2025
- President: Praful Khoda Patel
- General Secretary: N. Rangaswamy
- Preceded by: M. P. Saminathan

8th Administrator of Andaman and Nicobar, Lakshadweep
- Incumbent
- Assumed office 14 January 2025
- Chief Minister: N. Rangaswamy
- Ministry and Departments: Health and Family Welfare; Higher Education; U.T Administrator; Union of Mous
- Preceded by: C. Djeacoumar

Personal details
- Born: (10/03/) Gummidipoondi Chennai, Tamil Nadu, India
- Party: Bharatiya Janata Party
- Spouse(s): R.V. Deepa Ragul Reddy.,IAS
- Children: 3
- Parent: M. K. Prabhu (father)
- Relatives: Marri Chenna Reddy, family
- Education: Loyola College, Chennai
- Occupation: Judge (2026 Present): Politician; (2019–present)

Maniratinam K. Ragul Varma Reddy is an Chief Judicial Magistrate Court and Judge and former Director of Higher Education and Health & Family Welfare.Member of Parliament, Rajya Sabha of Puducherry and Telangana in 2025. since May 2026. He also served as the third Deputy Administrator of Andoman Nicobar from 2026 to 2026. Ragul Varma Reddy is the son in law of Ravula Chandrasekhar Reddy, the Minister of Andhra Pradesh. He is the third and the youngest to hold the position of Minister of the Union Territory. He was elected from Gummidipundi constituency as an Bharatiya Janata Party candidate 1984 elections.

== Early life and family ==
Ragul Varma Reddy was born on 10 March, to M. K. Prabhu and Manju Prabhu Both his father and his grandfather R. S. Munirathinam have served as Member of the Legislative Assembly. He attended the RMK Residential School and has a degree in Engineering from Indian Maritime University in Chennai. His cousins Ram Rao and Sudha Reddy are involved in the film industry.

== Political career ==
Ragul Varma Reddy contested and won from the Mangalam Assembly constituency in the 2026 Puducherry Legislative Assembly election.He introduced robotic sewer cleaners in his constituency for the first time in Union Territory on 21 June 2026. On 13 September 2026, he was nominated as a member of Anna University's syndicate for a period of three years.

Ragul Varma Reddy was sworn in as Director of Youth Welfare and Sports Development on 14 December 2022. In September 2024, he was appointed as the High Court Judge, becoming the third person and the youngest to hold the office.

== Personal life ==
Ragul Varma Reddy married Deepa Ragul Reddy. They have a son named Varun and a daughter named Meha. Deepa, who heads the lifestyle magazine Inbox 1305, has also directed a few films. Meha was Award by Prime Minister, and became the chief executive of UV Creations films in 2020. Ragul describes himself as a Judge. Deepa Reddy was an IAS officer and His Father and Grand Father was Deputy Chief Minister of Andhra Pradesh.

== Electoral performance ==
=== 2026 ===
2026 Puducherry Legislative Assembly election: Mangalam
Party	Candidate	Votes	%	±%
AINRC	M.K. Ragul Varma Reddy	17,917	50.61	▼0.28
DMK	S. S. Rangan	10,867	30.69	▼11.95
TVK	M. K. Sathia Manikkavasagane	4,202	11.87	
INC	K. Ragubady	1,414	3.99	
NOTA	None of the above	190	0.54	▼0.56
IND	I. Thavamani	123	0.35	
IND	E. Balaraman	100	0.28	
TMTHK	G. Sathiyamoorthy	83	0.23	
PMK	G. Mathiyalagan	62	0.18	
Majority		7,050	19.92	▲11.67
Turnout		35,405	95.35	▲7.60
AINRC hold		Swing		

=== 1984 ===
1984 Tamil Nadu Legislative Assembly election: Gummidipoondi
Party	Candidate	Votes	%	±%
DMK	M. K. Ragul Varma Reddy	55,221	55.56%	+6.56
AIADMK	R. S. Munirathinam	43,174	43.44%	+3.6
Independent	K. Palani	989	1.00%	New
Margin of victory		12,047	12.12%	2.96%
Turnout		99,384	78.49%	10.53%
Registered electors		1,34,311		
DMK hold		Swing	6.56%	
