= A. Raghava Reddy =

Indian politician

Member, Tamil Nadu Legislative Assembly
- In office 1962–1967
- Preceded by: Kamalambuiammal
- Succeeded by: K. A. Vezhavendan
- Constituency: Gummidipoondi

Personal details
- Born: 29 August 1912
- Party: Swatantra Party
- Profession: Agriculturist

A. Raghava Reddy was an Indian politician and former Tamil Nadu Legislative Assembly member. He belong to the area of Palavakkam of Tiruvallur district of Tamil Nadu. Being an affiliate of Swatantra Party Reddy successfully contested in 1962 assembly elections of Tamil Nadu at Gummidipoondi Assembly constituency.

== Electoral performance ==
=== 1962 ===
1962 Madras Legislative Assembly election: Gummidipoondi
Party	Candidate	Votes	%	±%
SWA	A. Raghava Reddy	19,575	46.50	New
INC	G. Kamalam Bujammal	18,946	45.01	+18.31
Independent	G. Peddaiya	3,576	8.49	New
Margin of victory		629	1.49	1.22
Turnout		42,097	58.61	14.17
Registered electors		75,560		
SWA gain from INC		Swing	19.80	
