= Jameatur Rashad =

Islamic institute in India

Jamiatur Rashad
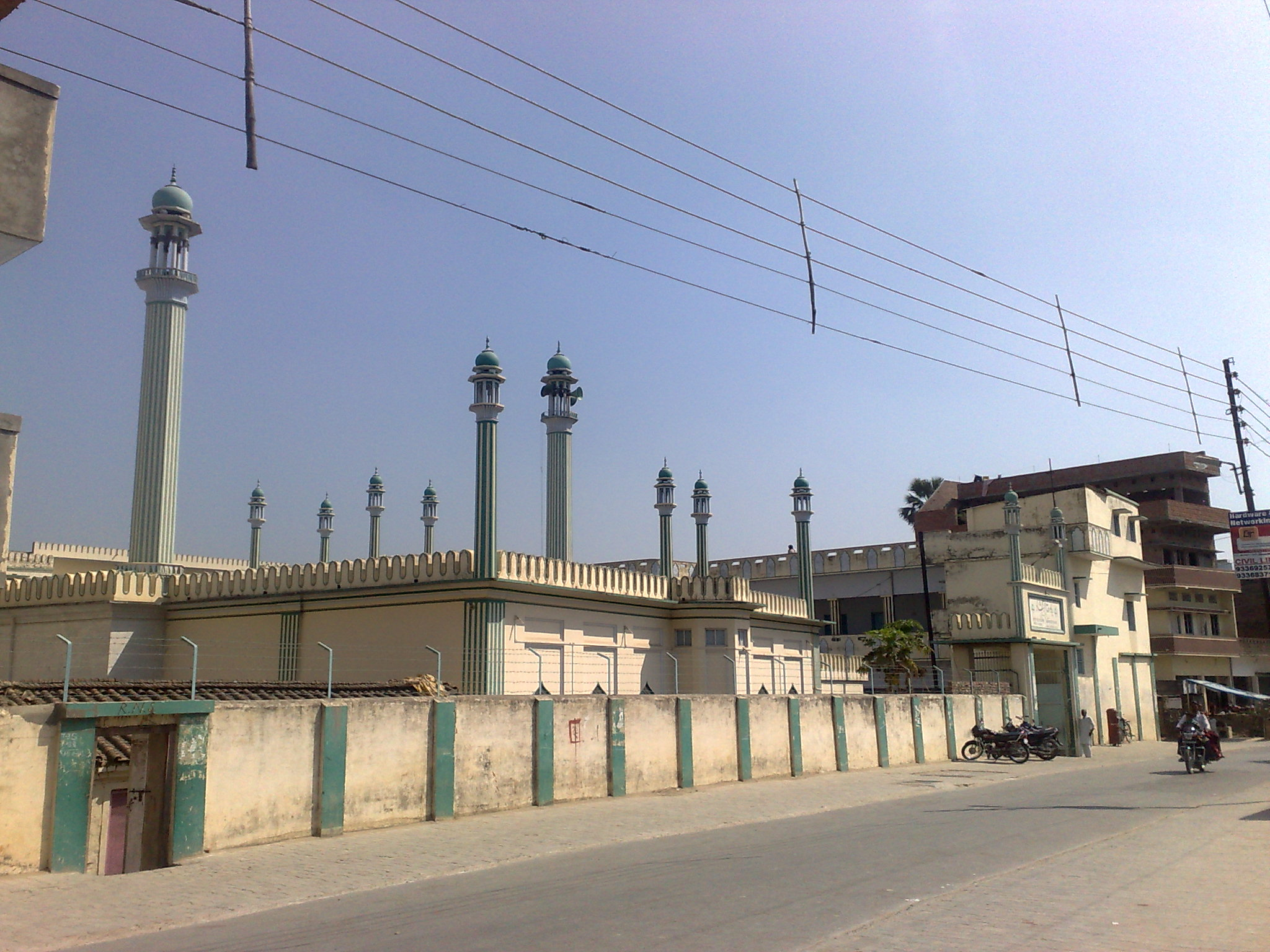
- Type: Islamic university
- Established: 1962 (64 years ago)
- Founder: Maulana Mujeebullah Nadwi
- Director: Aamir Rashadi Madni
- Location: Rashaad Nagar, Azamgarh, Azamgarh, Uttar Pradesh, India

Jameatur Rashad is an Islamic educational institute located in Azamgarh, India. It was founded by Maulana Mujeebullah Nadwi in 1962. Maulana Aamir Rashadi Madni who president of Rashtriya Ulama Council is director of the Jamia.

It was founded in 1962 by Hazrat Maulana Mujeebullah Nadvi Rahmatullah alaih. Maulana Aamir Rashadi Madni is the Chairman of The Jamiatur Rashad Educational Society, Azamgarh.

== Mosque ==
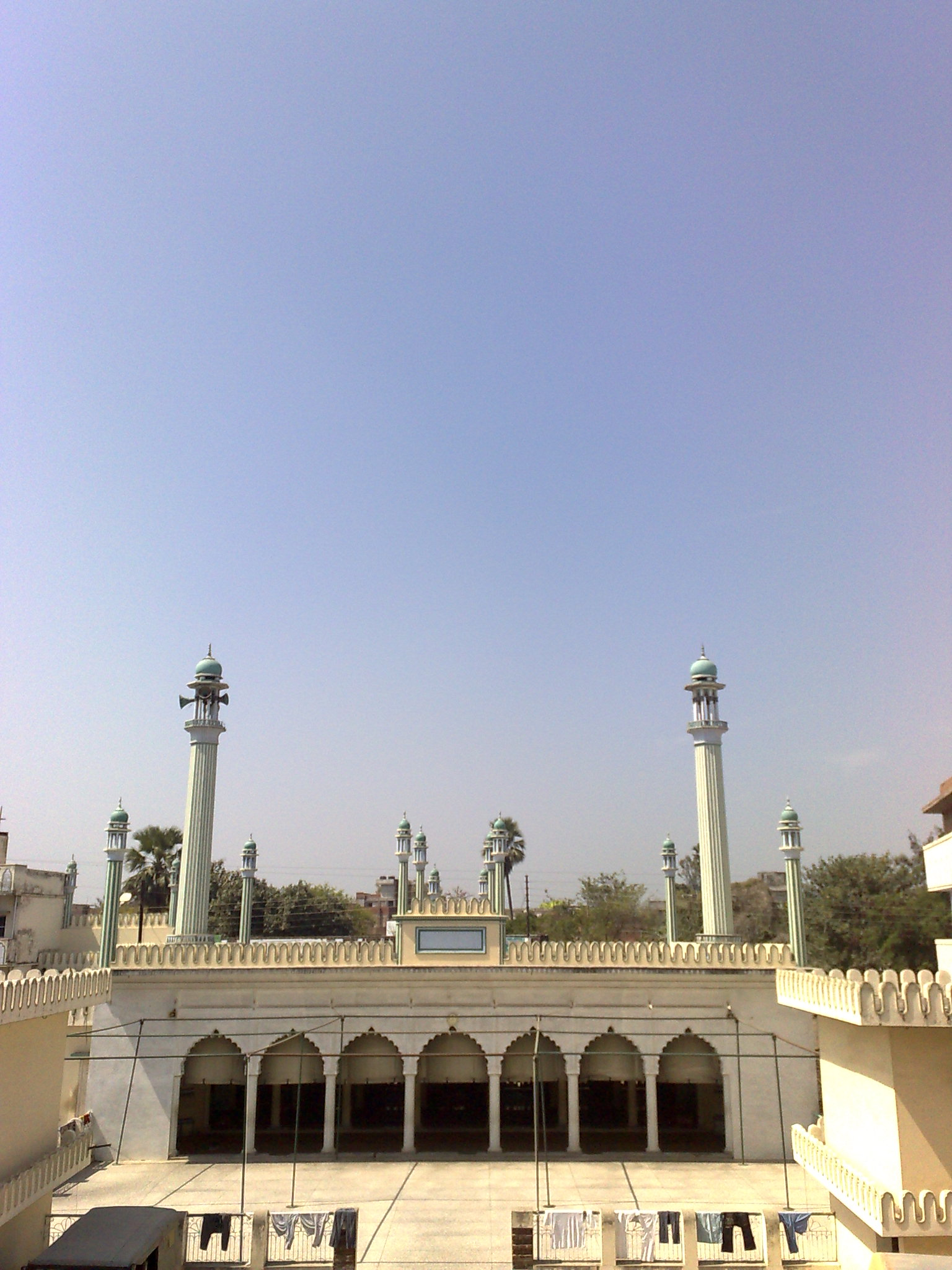
