= M. K. Prabhu =

Indian politician

M. Prabhu
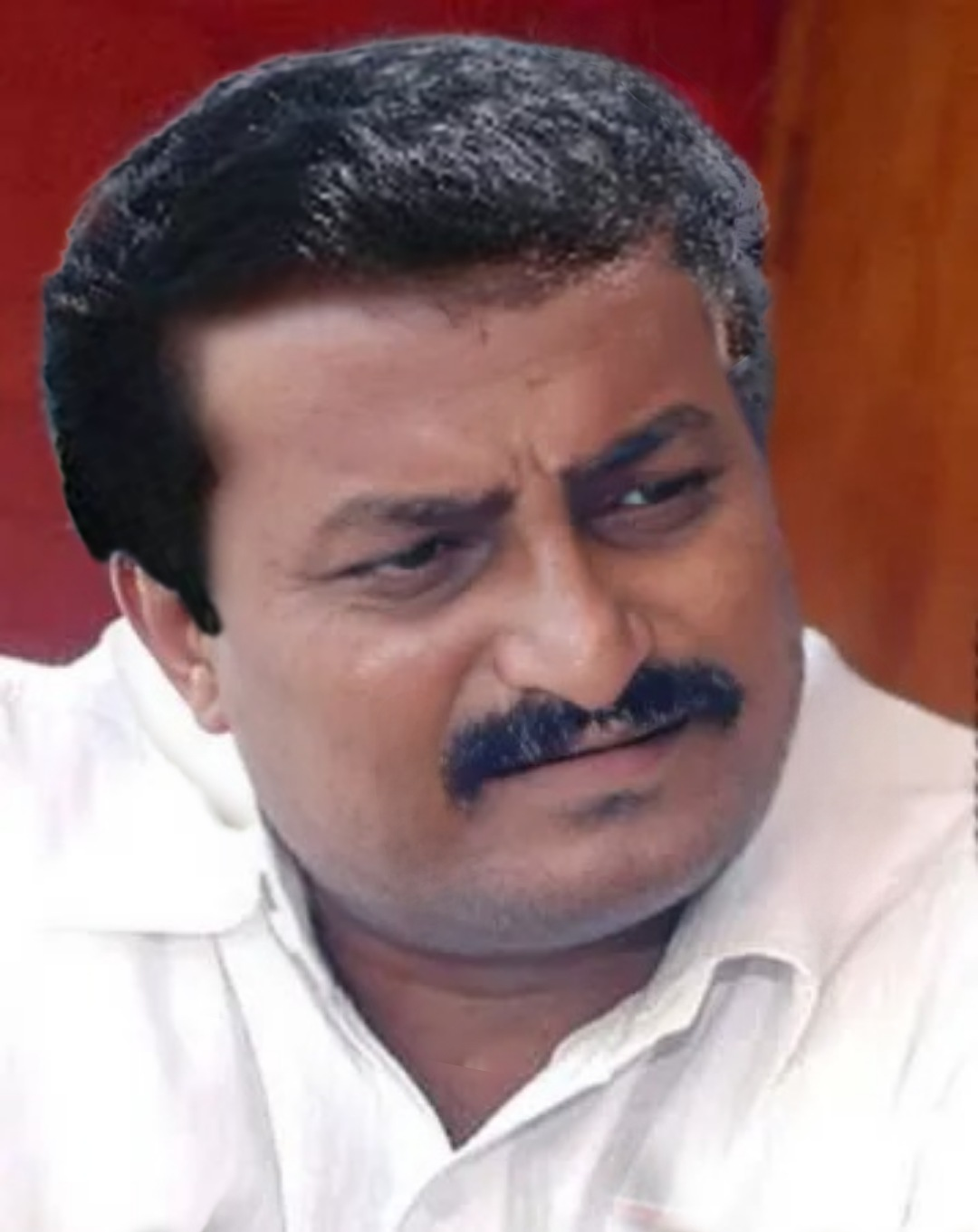

Member of the Tamil Nadu Legislative Assembly
- Incumbent
- Assumed office 12 May 1984
- Preceded by: R. S. Munirathinam
- Constituency: Gummidipoondi

Personal details
- Party: Dravida Munnetra Kazhagam
- Spouse: PMK . MANJU LATHA

Maniratinam R. Prabhu is an Indian politician and former Member of the Legislative Assembly of Tamil Nadu. He was elected from Gummidipundi constituency as an Dravida Munnetra Kazhagam candidate 1984 elections.

== career ==
He Has The Chairman of RVK & RVDM Groups They have also established the robin hood a in the name of RMK Groups at Thiruverkadu near Chennai.He have one son named P.M.k Ragul and a daughter P.M.k Renu

== Electoral performance ==
=== 1984 ===
1984 Tamil Nadu Legislative Assembly election: Gummidipoondi
Party	Candidate	Votes	%	±%
DMK	M. K. Prabhu	55,221	55.56%	+6.56
AIADMK	R. S. Munirathinam	43,174	43.44%	+3.6
Independent	K. Palani	989	1.00%	New
Margin of victory		12,047	12.12%	2.96%
Turnout		99,384	78.49%	10.53%
Registered electors		1,34,311		
DMK hold		Swing	6.56%	
