= E. V. K. S. Elangovan =

Indian politician (1948–2024)

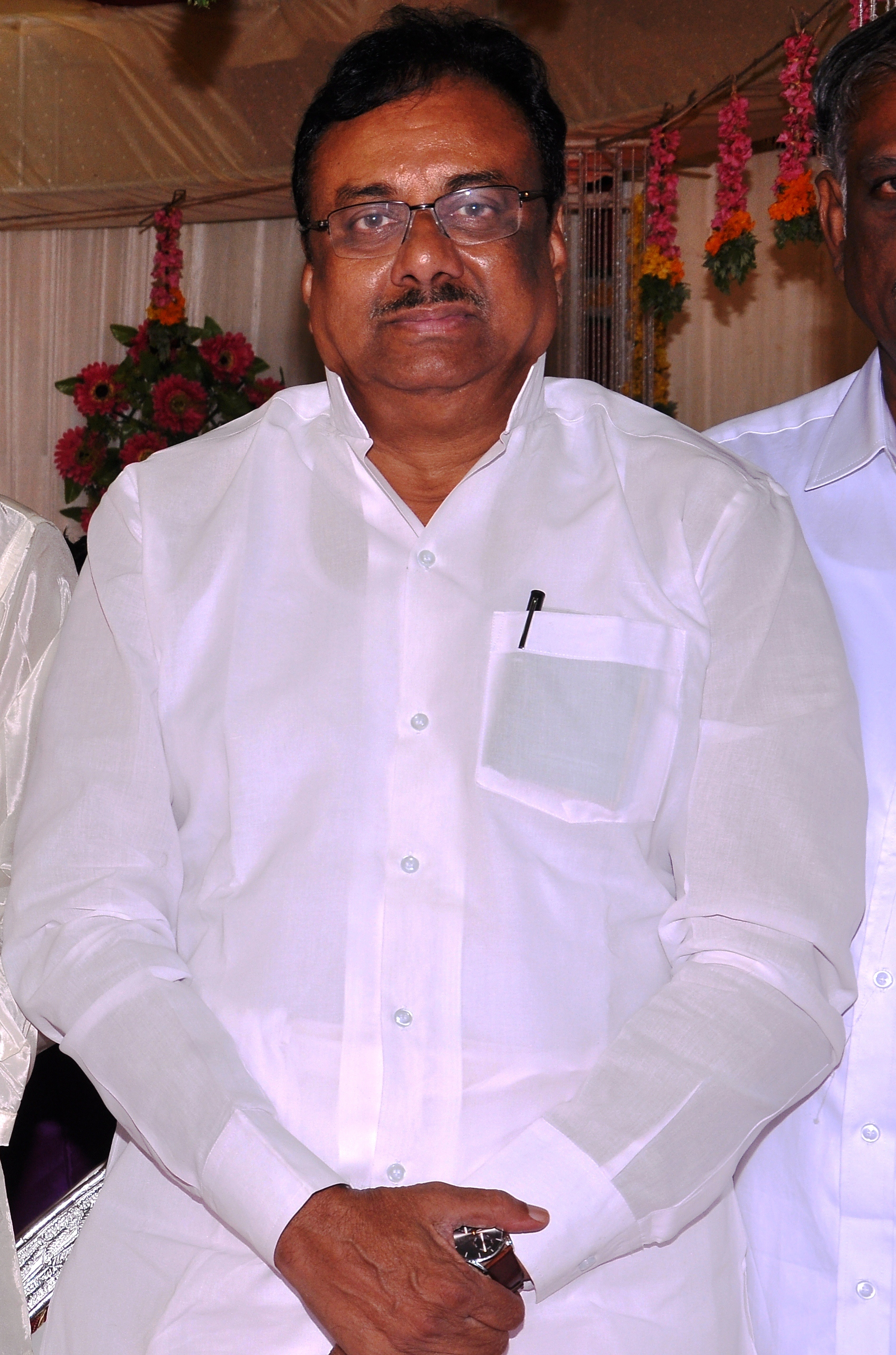

Member of Tamil Nadu Legislative Assembly
- In office 10 March 2023 – 14 December 2024
- Preceded by: Thirumagan Evera
- Succeeded by: V. C. Chandhirakumar
- Constituency: Erode East
- In office 1984-1989
- Constituency: Sathyamangalam

President, TNCC
- In office 2014–2016
- Preceded by: B. S. Gnanadesikan
- Succeeded by: Su. Thirunavukkarasar
- In office 2000–2002
- Preceded by: Tindivanam K. Ramamurthy
- Succeeded by: So. Balakrishnan

Minister of State in the Textiles
- In office 22 May 2004 — 23 May 2009

Member of Parliament, Lok Sabha
- In office 16 May 2004 — 16 May 2009
- Constituency: Gobichettipalayam

Personal details
- Born: 21 December 1948 Erode, Madras Province, India
- Died: 14 December 2024 (aged 75) Chennai, Tamil Nadu, India
- Party: Indian National Congress
- Other party: Tamizhaga Munnetra Munnani
- Spouse: Varalakshmi
- Children: 2 sons, including Thirumagan Evera
- Parent: E. V. K. Sampath

Erode Venkata Krishnasamy Sampath Elangovan (21 December 1948 – 14 December 2024) was an Indian politician who was a member of the Tamil Nadu Legislative Assembly, representing the Erode East Assembly constituency. He previously represented the Gobichettipalayam Lok Sabha constituency of Tamil Nadu and was the Textiles Minister for the Union Government between 2004 and 2009, in Prime Minister Dr Manmohan Singh Government. He was a member of the Indian National Congress party.

== Background ==
Elangovan was born in Erode District on 21 December 1948. He was the son of E. V. K. Sampath and the grandson of Periyar E. V. Ramasamy's brother Krishnasamy.

Elangovan died of lung disease on 14 December 2024, at the age of 75.

== Political career ==
In the 2009 Lok Sabha election, he lost to A. Ganeshamurthi of the MDMK by 49,336 votes in Erode constituency. He was appointed President of Tamil Nadu Congress Committee by All India Congress Committee Chief Sonia Gandhi on 31 October 2014, followed by the resignation of B. S. Gnanadesikan. In the 2019 Lok Sabha election he lost to O. P. Ravindranath Kumar, the son of O. Panneerselvam, in Theni. Elangovan was the only candidate of the UPA to lose in the 2019 Lok Sabha elections in Tamil Nadu. He was also elected as a Member of Legislative Assembly in Tamil Nadu from Sathyamangalam Assembly constituency in 1984 and Erode East constituency in a by-election in 2023, due to the death of his son Thirumagan Evera.

== Elections contested and positions held ==
=== Lok Sabha elections ===
Elections	Constituency	Party	Result	Vote percentage	Opposition Candidate	Opposition Party	Opposition vote percentage
1996	Krishnagiri	INC	Lost	26.59	C. Narasimhan	TMC	55.95
2004	Gobichettipalayam	INC	Won	62.75	Govindarajan.N. R	AIADMK	31.22
2009	Erode	INC	Lost	30.61	A. Ganeshamurthi	MDMK	37.05
2014	Tiruppur	INC	Lost	4.53	V. Sathyabama	AIADMK	42.57
2019	Theni	INC	Lost	36.44	P. Ravindhranath	AIADMK	42.96

=== Tamil Nadu Legislative elections ===
Elections	Constituency	Party	Result	Vote percentage	Opposition Candidate	Opposition Party	Opposition vote percentage
1984 Tamil Nadu Legislative Assembly election	Sathyamangalam	INC	Won	62.97	T. K. Subramaniam	DMK	31.04
1989 Tamil Nadu Legislative Assembly election	Bhavanisagar	Independent	Lost	7.90	V. K. Chinnasamy	AIADMK	37.44
2023 By-Election	Erode East	INC	Won	64.96	K. S. Thennarasu	AIADMK	25.83

Lok Sabha
Preceded by K. K. Kaliappan	Member of Parliament for Gobichettipalayam; 2004 – 2009	Succeeded by C. Sivasamy; Constituency renamed to Tiruppur
