= K. Venu =

K. Venu may refer to:

- K. Venu (Kerala), Naxalite leader from Kerala, see Central Reorganisation Committee, Communist Party of India (Marxist-Leninist)
- K. Venu (Tamil Nadu politician), politician from Tamil Nadu
