= Karnataka Rashtra Samithi =

Indian Political Party

- Abbreviation: KRS
- President: Deepak C N
- General Secretary: Raghpathi Bhat
- Treasurer: Vijayaraghava Marathe
- Founder: Ravi Krishna Reddy
- Founded: 2019
- Headquarters: Bengaluru
- Ideology: Kannada Regionalism
- Colours: Yellow
- ECI Status: Unrecognised Registered Party
- Seats in Karnataka Legislative Assembly: 0 / 224

Election symbol
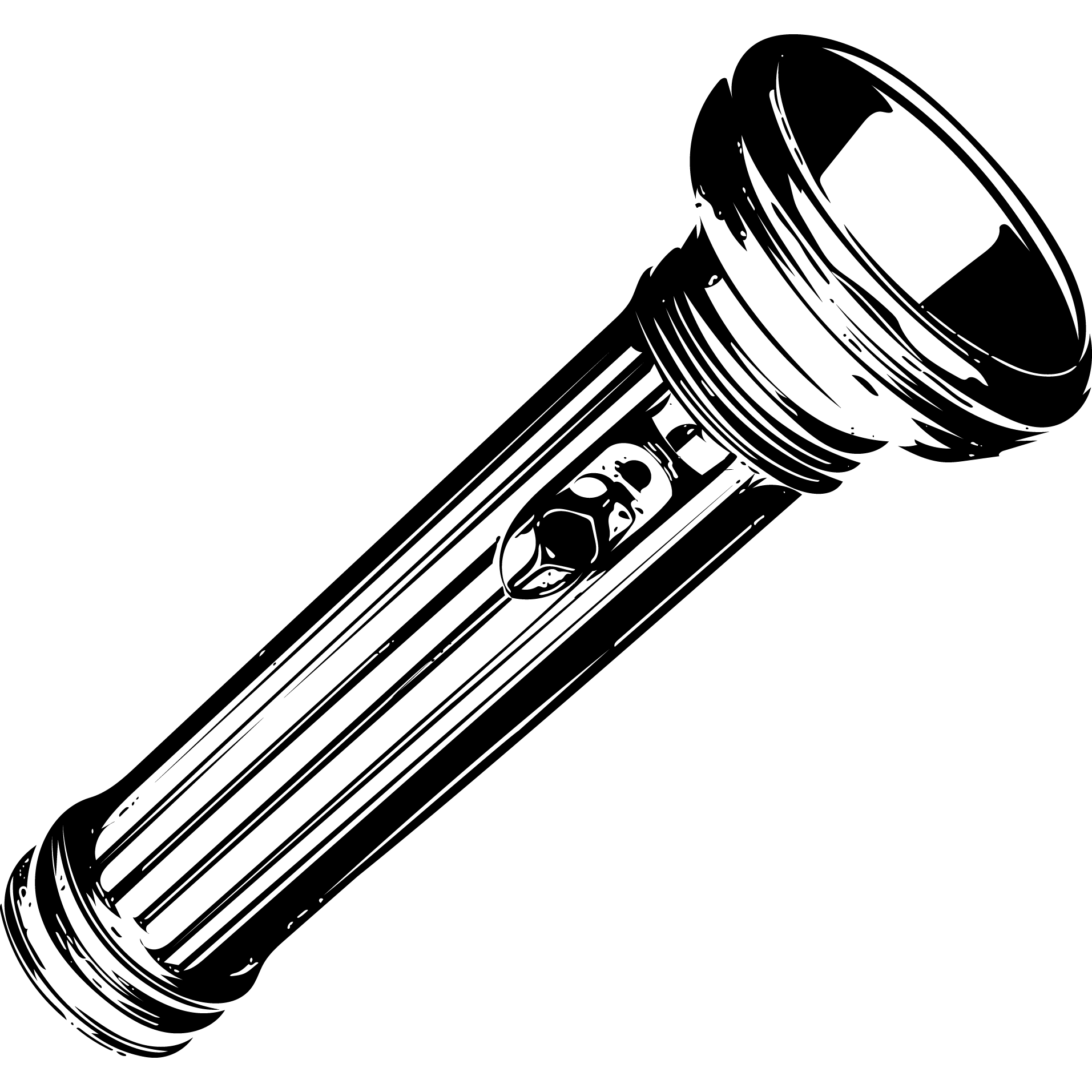

Party flag
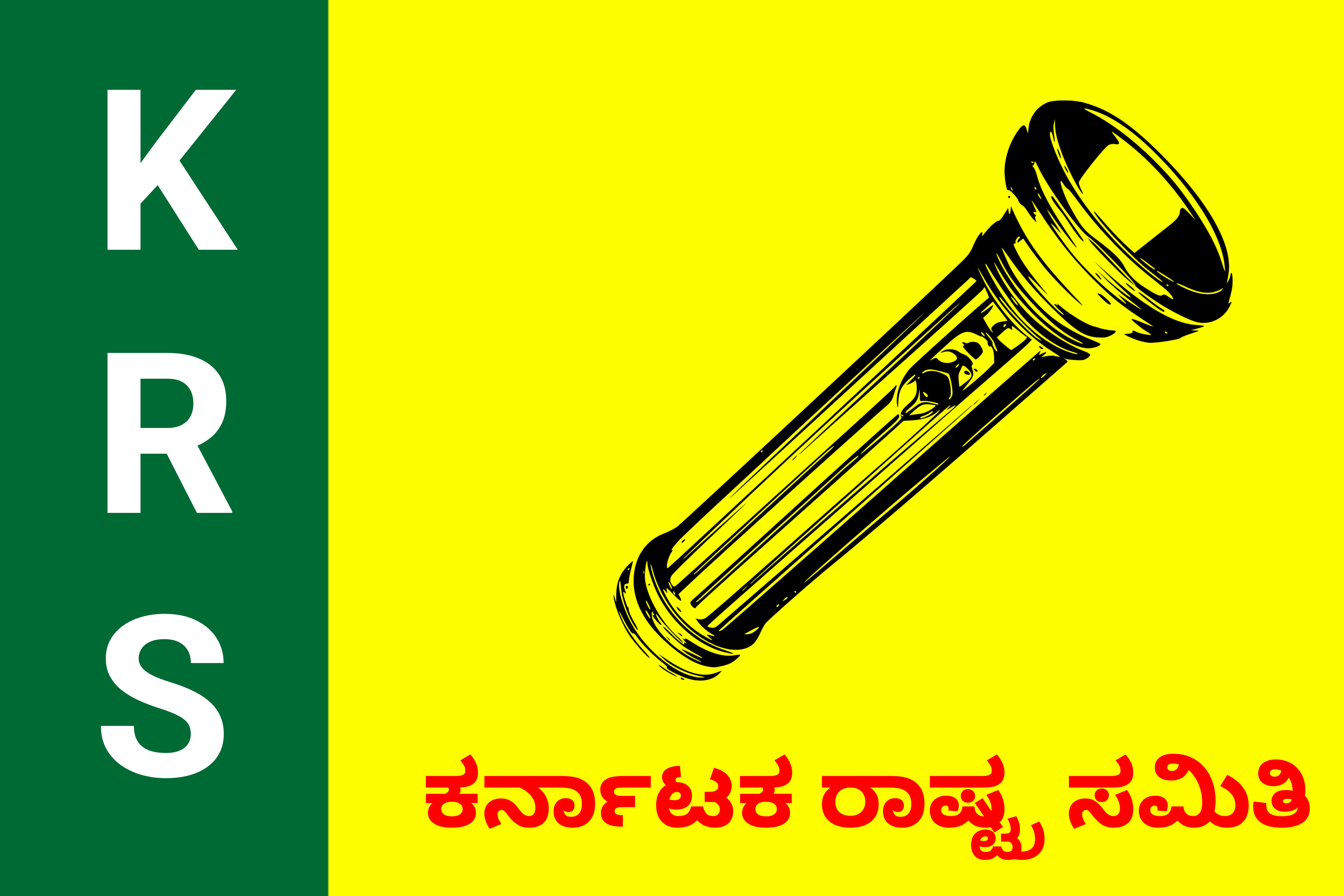

Website
- krsparty.org

Karnataka Rashtra Samithi (KRS) is an Indian political party based in Karnataka.
