= All India Mahila Empowerment Party =

- Abbreviation: AIMEP
- Leader: Nowhera Shaik (National President); Mohammed Aqil (Delhi State President)
- President: Nowhera Shaik
- Rajya Sabha Leader: none
- Lok Sabha Leader: none
- Founder: Nowhera Shaik
- Founded: 12 November 2017 (8 years ago); New Delhi
- Headquarters: Hyderabad, Telangana, India
- Ideology: Justice And Equality of All; Secularism; Gender Justice
- ECI status: Registered Party

Election symbol
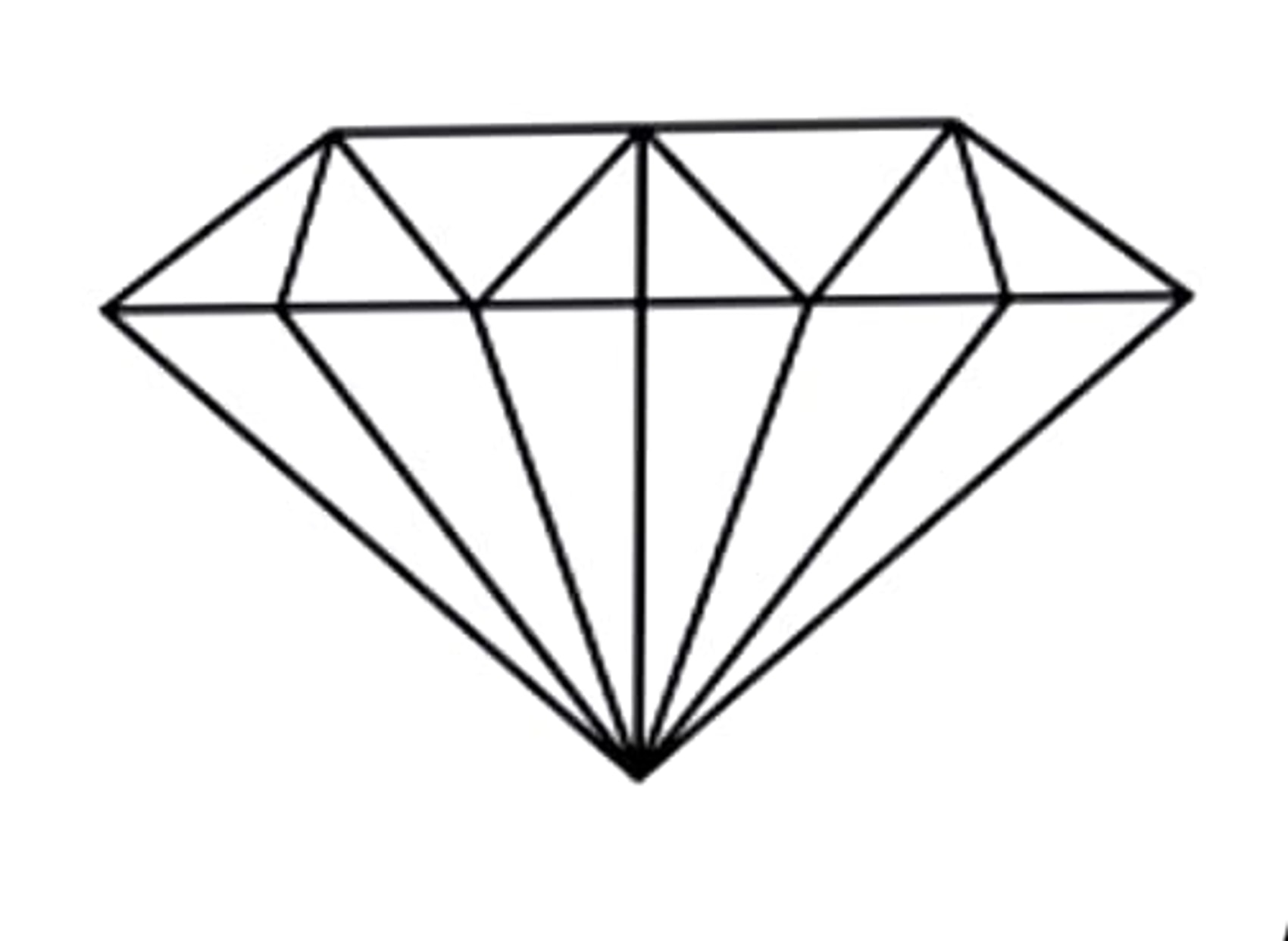

Website
- http://allindiamep.org/about.html

The All India Mahila Empowerment Party (AIMEP), is an Indian regional political party. It was founded on 12 November 2017 by Nowhera Shaik.

== History ==
The All India Mahila Empowerment Party was launched at The Lalit in New Delhi on 12 November 2017 in the presence of important personalities from different fields. The prime agenda of the party, as stated, is empowering women, irrespective of caste, creed and region. In its launching ceremony itself, the party has taken up the issue of women's representation in the Parliament of India, demanding the implementation of the Women's Reservation Bill.

== Elections ==
The Election Commission of India has recognized AIMEP as a Registered Unrecognised Political Party, allotting “Diamond” as its election symbol. AIMEP contested all 224 seats in the Karnataka Legislative Assembly elections in April 2018. After the total rout, 30 candidates filed a complaint of cheating against the party and Nowhera Shaik

Despite her party's disastrous performance in the Karnataka elections, she announced intentions to contest in the Telangana state elections, which also turned out to be unsuccessful. The party also unsuccessfully contested in the parliamentary elections 2019 and 2024.

== Leadership ==
- President : Nowhera Shaik
- Mumbai Districts President : Nilesh Bhupendra Patil
- Delhi State President : Mohammed Aqil
- Telangana State President : John
- Uttar Pradesh State President : Matiur Rahman
- Maharashtra State President : Sunita
- Karnataka State Core Committee In-charge : Muhammad Javed Ibrahim

== Controversy ==
Party President Nowhera Shaik was arrested by Mumbai Police's economic offences wing on 25 October 2018. She got a reprieve on 19 January 2021 when the Supreme Court granted an interim bail to her. Giving her six weeks' time, the court ordered her to clear the liabilities of all the complainants in cases where chargesheets have either been filed or complaints have been made.

Party President Nowhera Shaik courted controversy, when she announced her intention to contest the 2024 Lok Sabha election from the Hyderabad seat against MIM Chief and 4-time Member of Parliament, Asaduddin Owaisi. However, AIMEP eventually fielded Mr. Johnson, who received only 515 votes against 661981 received by Asaduddin Owaisi.

== See also ==
- List of political parties in India
