= Odisha Jan Morcha =

Odisha Janmorcha
- Chairperson: Pyarimohan Mohapatra
- Founded: 10 April 2013; 13 years ago
- Headquarters: Bhubaneshwar
- Ideology: Social democracy
- Colours: Sea Green
- ECI Status: Unrecognised Political Party
- Seats in Rajya Sabha: 0 / 245
- Seats in: 0 / 147

Election symbol

Odisha Janmorcha (OJM) is a political party of the Indian state of Odisha led by Pyarimohan Mohapatra. It was founded on 10 April 2013. Odisha Janmorcha Party is allotted 'kite' symbol by the Election commission of India.

== See also ==
- List of political parties in India
