= Thirumagan Evera =

Indian politician (died 2022)

Thirumahan Everaa.E.

Member of the Tamil Nadu Legislative Assembly
- In office 11 May 2021 – 4 January 2023
- Preceded by: K. S. Thennarasu
- Succeeded by: E. V. K. S. Elangovan
- Constituency: Erode East

Personal details
- Born: 29 February 1976
- Died: 4 January 2023 (aged 46) Erode, Tamil Nadu, India
- Party: Indian National Congress
- Relations: "Periyar" E. V. Ramasamy (great-grand-uncle); E. V. Krishnasamy (great-grandfather); E. V. K. Sampath (grandfather)
- Children: Samanna Everaa (daughter)
- Parent: E. V. K. S. Elangovan (father)
- Education: B.A. Economics, University of Madras

Thirumagan Evera (29 February 1976 - 4 January 2023) was an Indian politician from the Indian National Congress. He served as a Member of Legislative Assembly of Tamil Nadu, representing Erode East from May 2021 up until his death in January 2023.

== Early life and education ==
Evera was the son of E. V. K. S. Elangovan, who served as a Minister of State under Manmohan Singh (2004–09).

Evera obtained a Bachelor of Arts (B.A) degree in Economics from the University of Madras in 1999.

== Elections contested ==
Election	Constituency	Party	Result	Vote %	Runner-up	Runner-up Party	Runner-up vote %	Ref.
2021 Tamil Nadu Legislative Assembly election	Erode (East)	INC	Won	44.27%	M.Yuvaraja	Tamil Maanila Congress (M) (contested in Double leaves symbol)	38.41%	

== Family ==
His daughter Samanna Everaa is an equestrian athlete, who became the youngest gold medallist at the Concours de Dressage Nationals 2024 conducted by the Equestrian Federation of India (EFI) at the Surge Stable Centre in Bengaluru, Karnataka.

== Death ==
On 4 January 2023, Evera suffered chest pains while at his house in Erode. He was taken to a hospital but died on the way. He was 46.
