= Erode East Assembly constituency =

State Legislative Assembly Constituency in Tamil Nadu

Coordinates: 11.337°N 77.743°E

Erode (East)
- Constituency No. 98 for the Tamil Nadu Legislative Assembly

Constituency details
- Country: India
- Region: South India
- State: Tamil Nadu
- District: Erode
- Lok Sabha constituency: Erode
- Established: 2008
- Total electors: 1,79,592
- Reservation: None

Member of Legislative Assembly
- 17th Tamil Nadu Legislative Assembly
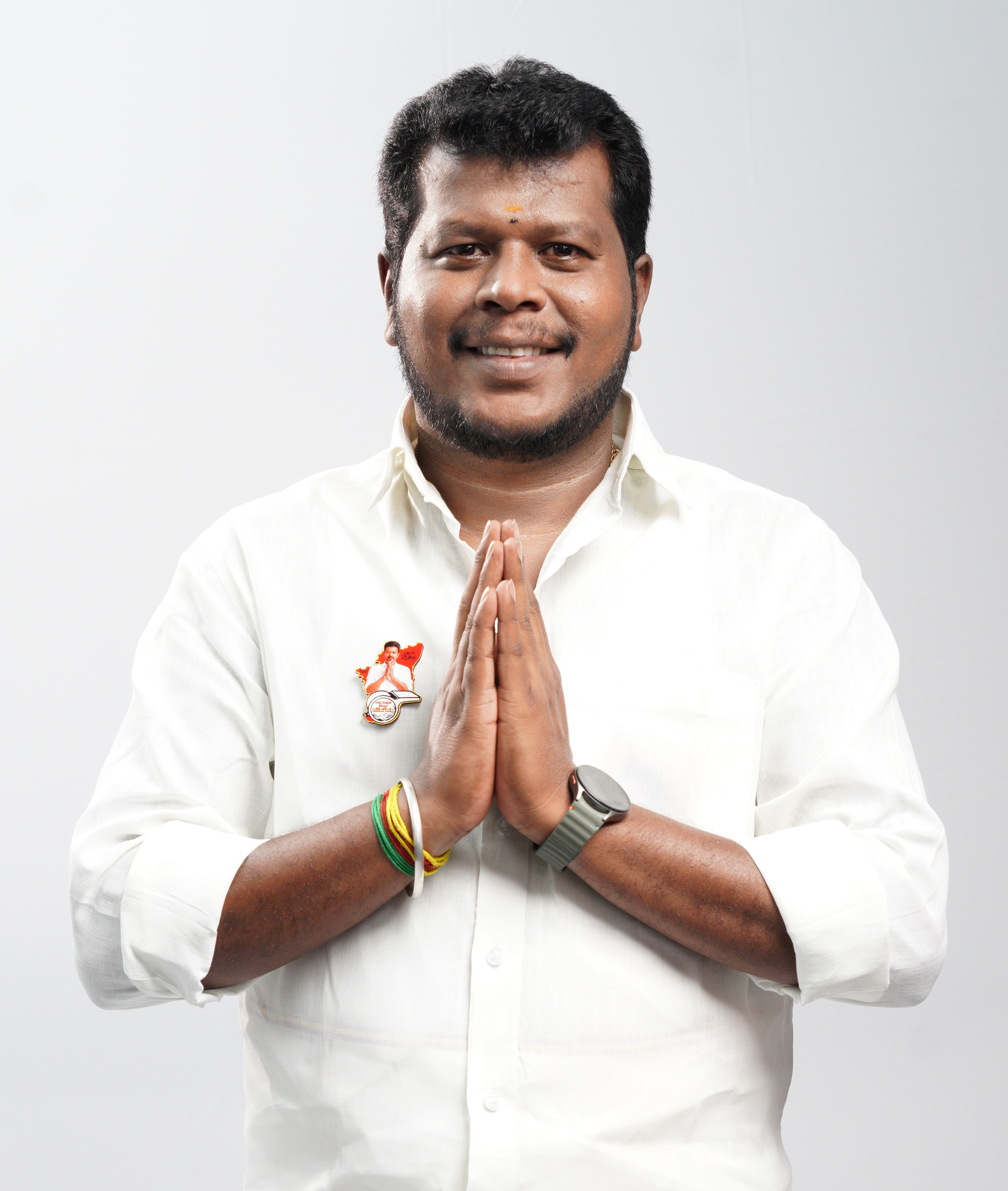
- Incumbent M. Vijay Balaji
- Party: Tamilaga Vettri Kazhagam
- Elected year: 2026

Erode East is a state assembly constituency in Erode district in the state of Tamil Nadu, India. Its State Assembly Constituency number is 98. It consists of a portion of Erode taluk which includes Erode City. It is included in Erode Lok Sabha constituency. Erode East is completely an urban constituency which covers 33 wards out of 80 wards of Erode city corporation. It is one of the 234 State Legislative Assembly Constituencies in Tamil Nadu, in India.

This constituency was newly formed, in the year of 2008, by dividing the integrated Erode Assembly Constituency.

== Boundaries and parts ==
Erode East covers the central part of Erode City Corporation to the river Kaveri on the east, Erode West Assembly Constituency on the west and Modakkurichi Assembly constituency limit on the south which also covers some parts of Erode city.

== Demographics ==
The Kongu Vellalar Gounder and Sengundha Mudhaliyar communities constituted about 60% of the total population of this constituency in 2021.

Gender demographic of Erode East as of 11.02.2023, taken during the 2023 by-election:

| Year | Female | Male | Transgender | Total |
|---|---|---|---|---|
| 2023 | 1,16,497 | 1,11,025 | 25 | 2,27,547 |

== Members of Legislative Assembly ==
Elected members from this constituency are as follows:

| Year | Member | Political Party |
|---|---|---|
| 2011 | V. C. Chandhirakumar | Desiya Murpokku Dravida Kazhagam |
| 2016 | K. S. Thennarasu | All India Anna Dravida Munnetra Kazhagam |
| 2021 | Thirumagan Evera | Indian National Congress |
| 2023 (Note: The 2023 by-election was held following the death of Thirumagan Evera.) | E. V. K. S. Elangovan | Indian National Congress |
| 2025 (Note: The 2025 by-election was held following the death of E. V. K. S. Elangovan.) | V. C. Chandhirakumar | Dravida Munnetra Kazhagam |
| 2026 | M. Vijay Balaji | Tamilaga Vettri Kazhagam |

== Election results ==
Vote share of winning candidates
| 2026 | 42.93% |
| 2025 | 74.70% |
| 2023 | 64.58% |
| 2021 | 44.27% |
| 2016 | 43.83% |
| 2011 | 50.83% |

=== 2026 ===
2026 Tamil Nadu Legislative Assembly election: Erode (East)
| Party | Candidate | Votes | % | ±% |
|---|---|---|---|---|
| TVK | M. Vijay Balaji | 69,747 | 42.93 | New |
| INC | Gopinath Palaniyappan | 45,781 | 28.18 | New |
| AIADMK | R. Manoharan | 38,183 | 23.50 | New |
| NTK | S. Thandavamoorthy | 4,987 | 3.07 | ▼12.52 |
| NOTA | NOTA | 879 | 0.54 | ▼3.40 |
| Independent | J. Muthu Bava | 858 | 0.53 | New |
| Independent | H. Mohamed Gaipeer | 321 | 0.20 | New |
| BSP | B. Chitra | 256 | 0.16 | New |
| Vishwa Tamil Kazhagam | M. Kamal Kumar | 227 | 0.14 | New |
| Independent | R. Vairam | 196 | 0.12 | New |
| Samaniya Makkal Nala Katchi | K. Manikannan | 173 | 0.11 | New |
| Independent | Nathiya.S | 136 | 0.08 | New |
| Independent | C. Thiyagarajan | 132 | 0.08 | New |
| Independent | M. Dharani Kumar | 96 | 0.06 | New |
| TVK | A. Manikandan | 86 | 0.05 | New |
| Tamilaga Makkal Nala Katchi | K. Dhavasiappan | 80 | 0.05 | New |
| Veerath Thiyagi Viswanathadoss Thozhilalarkal Katchi | R. Dhandapani | 76 | 0.05 | New |
| Independent | S. Lakshmanathan | 67 | 0.04 | New |
| Independent | M.V. Karthy | 66 | 0.04 | New |
| Independent | Shanmugam.P | 55 | 0.03 | New |
| Independent | M. Murugesan | 51 | 0.03 | New |
| Margin of victory | | 23,966 | 14.75 | ▼44.36 |
| Turnout | | 1,62,453 | 90.46 | ▲22.40 |
| Registered electors | | 1,79,592 | | ▼47,977 |
| TVK gain from DMK | | Swing | ▲42.93 | |

=== 2025 ===
2025 Tamil Nadu Legislative Assembly Bye-election: Erode East
| Party | Candidate | Votes | % | ±% |
|---|---|---|---|---|
| DMK | V. C. Chandhirakumar | 115,709 | 74.70 | New |
| NTK | M. K. Seethalakshmi | 24,151 | 15.59 | ▲9.24 |
| Others | Other party candidates | 2,911 | 1.88 | ▲1.04 |
| Independent | Independent candidates | 6,010 | 3.88 | ▲2.75 |
| NOTA | None of the above | 6,109 | 3.94 | ▲3.47 |
| Margin of victory | | 91,558 | 59.11 | ▲20.28 |
| Turnout | | 154,890 | 68.06 | ▼6.73 |
| Registered electors | | 227,569 | | |
| DMK gain from INC | | Swing | +10.12 | |

=== 2023 ===
2023 Tamil Nadu Legislative Assembly Bye-election: Erode East
| Party | Candidate | Votes | % | ±% |
|---|---|---|---|---|
| INC | E. V. K. S. Elangovan | 110,156 | 64.58 | ▲20.31 |
| AIADMK | K. S. Thennarasu | 43,923 | 25.75 | New |
| NTK | Menaka Navaneethan | 10,827 | 6.35 | ▼1.30 |
| DMDK | S. Anand | 1,432 | 0.84 | New |
| Others | Other party candidates | 1,501 | 0.84 | ▲0.18 |
| Independent | Independent candidates | 1,926 | 1.13 | ▲0.50 |
| NOTA | None of the above | 798 | 0.47 | ▼0.55 |
| Margin of victory | | 66,233 | 38.83 | ▲32.97 |
| Turnout | | 170,563 | 74.79 | ▲7.97 |
| Registered electors | | 227,547 | | |
| INC hold | | Swing | +20.31 | |

=== 2021 ===
2021 Tamil Nadu Legislative Assembly election: Erode East
| Party | Candidate | Votes | % | ±% |
|---|---|---|---|---|
| INC | E. Thirumagan Evera | 67,300 | 44.27 | New |
| AIADMK | M. Yuvaraja | 58,396 | 38.41 | ▼5.42 |
| NTK | S. Gomathi | 11,629 | 7.65 | ▲6.12 |
| MNM | A. M. R. Rajakumar | 10,005 | 6.98 | New |
| AMMK | S. A. Muthukumaran | 1,204 | 0.79 | New |
| Others | Other party candidates | 998 | 0.66 | |
| Independent | Independent candidates | 959 | 0.63 | |
| NOTA | None of the above | 1,546 | 1.02 | ▼1.07 |
| Margin of victory | | 8,904 | 5.86 | ▲0.59 |
| Turnout | | 152,037 | 66.57 | ▼3.00 |
| Registered electors | | 228,402 | | |
| INC gain from AIADMK | | Swing | +0.43 | |

=== 2016 ===
2016 Tamil Nadu Legislative Assembly election: Erode East
| Party | Candidate | Votes | % | ±% |
|---|---|---|---|---|
| AIADMK | K. S. Thennarasu | 64,879 | 43.83 | New |
| DMK | V. C. Chandhirakumar | 57,085 | 38.57 | ▼4.44 |
| DMDK | Ponchairman | 6,776 | 4.58 | ▼46.25 |
| BJP | Rajeshkumar P | 5,549 | 3.75 | ▲1.36 |
| Others | Other candidates | 10,633 | 7.18 | |
| NOTA | None Of The Above | 3,096 | 2.09 | ▲0.11 |
| Margin of victory | | 7,794 | 5.27 | ▼2.56 |
| Turnout | | 148,018 | 69.57 | ▼8.00 |
| Registered electors | | 212,746 | | |
| AIADMK gain from DMDK | | Swing | -7.00 | |

=== 2011 ===
2011 Tamil Nadu Legislative Assembly election: Erode East
| Party | Candidate | Votes | % | ±% |
|---|---|---|---|---|
| DMDK | V. C. Chandhirakumar | 69,166 | 50.83 | New |
| DMK | S. Muthusamy | 58,522 | 43.01 | New |
| BJP | Rajeshkumar P | 3,244 | 2.38 | New |
| Independent | Minnal Murugash R | 2,439 | 1.79 | New |
| NOTA | None of the above | 2,700 | 1.98 | New |
| Margin of victory | | 10,644 | 7.82 | New |
| Turnout | | 136,071 | 77.58 | New |
| Registered electors | | 175,395 | | |
| DMDK win (new seat) | | | | |
