= Vijay Kumar =

Vijay Kumar may refer to:

- Vijay Kumar (cricketer) (born 1975), Indian cricketer
- V. S. Vijay Kumar (1944–2019), Indian cricketer
- Vijay Kumar (sport shooter) (born 1985), sport shooter and Olympic silver medalist from India
- Vijay Kumar (roboticist) (born 1962), Indian-American professor
- Vijay C. Kumar (fl. 1988–2017), Indian Telugu film director
- K. Vijay Kumar (born 1952), Indian police officer
- Vijay Kumar (Tamil filmmaker) (born 1987)
- Vijay Kumar (molecular biologist) (born 1954), Indian molecular biologist
- Vijay "Lallu" Kumar, fictional character portrayed by Akshay Kumar in the 1995 Indian film Sabse Bada Khiladi
- Vijay Kumar, fictional character portrayed by Akshay Kumar in the 1995 Indian film Paandav
- Vijay Kumar, fictional Bollywood actor portrayed by Akshay Kumar in the 2023 Indian film Selfiee
- Vijay Kumar (athlete)
- Vijay Kumar (Bihar politician)
- Vijay Kumar (director)
- Vijay Kumar (Jammu and Kashmir politician)

== See also ==
- Vijayakumar (disambiguation)
