= T. J. Govindrajan =

Indian politician

T. J. Govindarajan

Member of the Tamil Nadu Legislative Assembly
- Incumbent
- Assumed office 12 May 2021
- Preceded by: K. S. Vijayakumar
- Constituency: Gummidipoondi

Personal details
- Party: Dravida Munnetra Kazhagam
- Spouse: G. Geetha
- Parent: S. V. Jayaraman (father)

T. Jayaraman Govindrajan (15 January 1961) is an Indian politician from Tamil Nadu. He represents Gummidipoondi Assembly constituency in Thiruvallur district. He became a member of the Tamil Nadu Legislative Assembly representing Dravida Munnetra Kazhagam. He won the 2021 Tamil Nadu Legislative Assembly election.

== Early life and education ==
Govindrajan is from Gummidipoondi, Thiruvallur district, Tamil Nadu. He is the son of S. V. Jayaraman. He owns TJS Group of institutions, TJS Fuel station, TJS Brick Works, Motivational Speaker, Organic Farmer. He completed his S.S.L.C. in 1977 at Government Higher Secondary School.

== Career ==
Govindrajan won the 2021 Tamil Nadu Legislative Assembly election from the Gummidipoondi Assembly constituency representing DMK Party. He polled 126,452 votes and defeated his nearest rival, Prakash M of PMK, by a margin of 50,938 votes.

== Electoral performance ==
Election	Party	Constituency Name	Result	Votes gained	Vote share%
2021	Dravida Munnetra Kazhagam	Gummidipoondi	Won	126,452	57.40%
