= Makkal Desiya Murpokku Dravida Kazhagam =

Makkal Desiya Murpokku Dravida Kazhagam மக்கள் தேசிய முற்போக்கு திராவிடக் கழகம்
- Founded: 10 April 2016
- Headquarters: Chennai

Makkal Desiya Murpokku Dravida Kazhagam (MDMDK) (Tamil: மக்கள் தேசிய முற்போக்கு திராவிடக் கழகம்; English: People's National Progressive Dravidian Federation) is a regional political outfit formed by former DMDK propaganda secretary and MLA V. C. Chandhirakumar and two MLAs, S.R. Parthipan and C. H. Sekar in the Indian state of Tamil Nadu, along the lines of the regional Dravidian political parties. They formally announced the outfit's formation on 10 April 2016 at Chennai.

== Birth of MDMDK ==
The outfit formed by former DMDK secretary and MLA V.C. Chandhirakumar and two MLAs, S.R. Parthipan and C. H. Sekar who were a part of DMDK. Following 2016 assembly election alliance dispute with the DMDK chief Vijayakanth, seven former district secretaries and three MLAs deserted themselves from Vijayakanth-led party and formed Makkal Desiya Murpokku Dravida Kazhagam.

== 2016 Assembly Election ==
Makkal-DMDK was formed and Dravida Munnetra Kazhagam treasurer M K Stalin invited Makkal Desiya Murpokku Dravida Kazhagam to meet party chief Karunanidhi. Following this, Makkal DMDK functionaries led by Chandrakumar called on both Stalin and Karunanidhi. Later, speaking to reporters, Chandrakumar said that they offered unconditional support to DMK. in the 2016 assembly election.
