= S. Vijayakumar =

Indian politician (born 1970)

S. Vijayakumar (born 1970) is an Indian politician from Tamil Nadu. He is a member of the Tamil Nadu Legislative Assembly from Gummidipoondi Assembly constituency in Tiruvallur district representing Tamilaga Vettri Kazhagam.

Vijayakumar is from Tiruvallur district, Tamil Nadu. He is the Tiruvallur North district party secretary.

Vijayakumar became an MLA for the first time winning the 2026 Tamil Nadu Legislative Assembly election from Gummidipoondi Assembly constituency representing the TVK Party. He polled 94,320 votes and defeated his nearest rival, Sudhakar. V. of the All India Anna Dravida Munnetra Kazhagam, by a margin of 27,945 votes.
