= Vijayakumar =

Vijayakumar is an Indian name. Notable people with the name include:

- Vijayakumar (Tamil actor) (born 1943), Indian actor in Tamil cinema
- Vijayakumar (Malayalam actor), Indian actor in Malayalam cinema
- Vijayakumar Menon, Indian art critic from Kerala
- A. Vijayakumar, Indian politician
- C Vijayakumar (born 1967), Indian business executive
- Duniya Vijay Indian actor and director in Kannada cinema
- G.P. Vijayakumar, Indian film producer
- K. Vijayakumar, Indian Police Service officer
- K. M. Vijayakumar, Tamil Nadu, South India politician
- K. N. Vijayakumar, Tamil Nadu, South India politician
- K. S. Vijayakumar, Tamil Nadu, South India politician
- M. Vijayakumar (born 1950), Kerala, South India politician
- Manjula Vijayakumar (1953–2013), South Indian actress
- Margi Vijayakumar (born 1960), Kathakali artiste
- Meenakshi Vijayakumar (born 1964)
- Preetha Vijayakumar (born 1975), Indian actress
- Rukmini Vijayakumar (born 1980), Bharatanatyam dancer
- S. R. Vijayakumar (born 1974), Indian politician
- Selladore Vijayakumar (born 1979), cricketer
- Sethu Vijayakumar, Indian roboticist
- Vanitha Vijayakumar, Indian actress

== See also ==
- Vijay Kumar (disambiguation)
