= Param Digvijay Dal =

- President: Krishna Mohan Shankar Yogi
- Headquarters: Vishisht Dhyan Yog Ashram, 248, Tedhi Bazar, Ayodhya, Faizabad(UP) - 224123

Website
- www.paramdivijaydal.org

Param Digvijay Dal is a registered political party of India. It was registered in 2011 from Election Commission of India.

== See also ==
- List of political parties in India
