= Jan Shakti Party of India =

- Abbreviation: JSPI
- President: Gurjeet Singh "Azad"
- Secretary: Prabhjot Singh "Josh"
- Founded: 2014 (Officially Estd. 17-03-2015)
- Headquarters: Ludhiana, Punjab
- Colours
- ECI Status: Political party

Website
- jspi.org.in

The Jan Shakti Party of India is a registered political party in the Indian state of Punjab. The JSPI was founded on 17 March 2015 by a group of social activists of Ludhiana city. The JSPI is currently led by Gurjeet Singh Azad.

== See also ==
- List of political parties in India
