= K. A. Vezhavendan =

Indian politician (1936–2022)

K. A. Vezhavendan (5 May 1936 - 26 January 2022) (Tamil: கா.வேழவேந்தன்) was an Indian politician and former Member of the Legislative Assembly of Tamil Nadu. He was elected to the Tamil Nadu legislative assembly from Gummidipundi constituency as a Dravida Munnetra Kazhagam candidate in 1967, and 1971 elections. He died on 26 January 2022.

== Electoral performance ==
1984 Tamil Nadu Legislative Assembly election: Gummidipoondi
Party	Candidate	Votes	%	±%
AIADMK	R. S. Munirathinam	55,221	55.56	+6.56
DMK	K. A. Vezhavendan	43,174	43.44	+3.6
Independent	K. Palani	989	1.00	New
Margin of victory		12,047	12.12	2.96
Turnout		99,384	78.49	10.53
Registered electors		1,34,311		
AIADMK hold		Swing	6.56	

1971 Tamil Nadu Legislative Assembly election: Gummidipoondi
Party	Candidate	Votes	%	±%
DMK	K. A. Vezhavendan	43,355	58.41	+5.83
INC	P. Obul Reddy	30,875	41.59	−4.59
Margin of victory		12,480	16.81	10.43
Turnout		74,230	77.70	2.29
Registered electors		98,918		
DMK hold		Swing	5.83	

1967 Madras Legislative Assembly election: Gummidipoondi
Party	Candidate	Votes	%	±%
DMK	K. A. Vezhavendan	35,887	52.57	New
INC	G. Kamalam Bujammal	31,527	46.19	+1.18
Independent	A. V. J. Natcker	848	1.24	New
Margin of victory		4,360	6.39	4.89
Turnout		68,262	75.41	16.80
Registered electors		94,205		
DMK gain from SWA		Swing	6.07	
