= Aamir Rashadi Madni =

Indian politician and Islamic cleric

Maulana Aamir Rashadi Madni
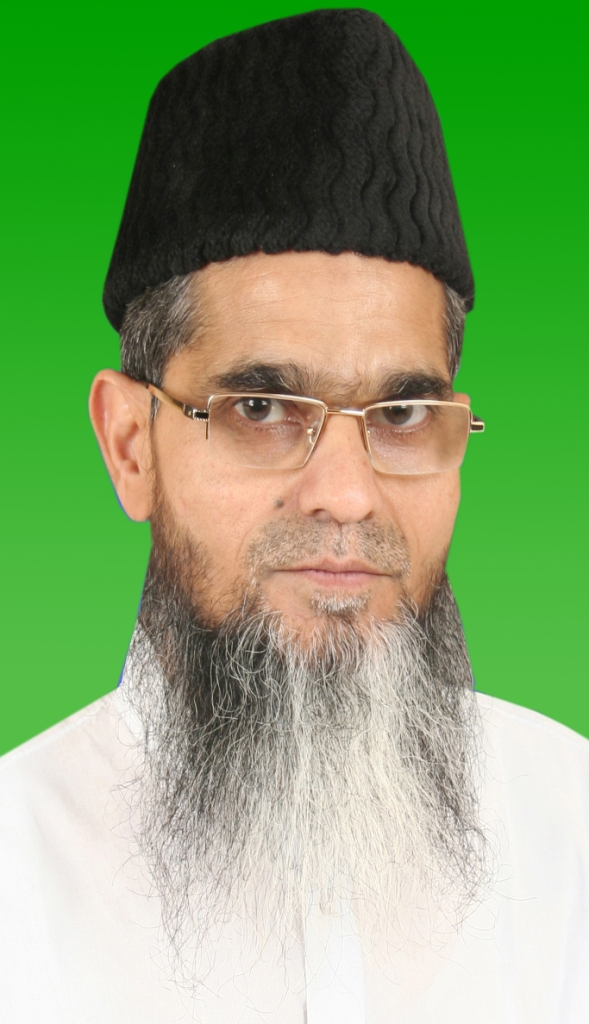

National President of Rashtriya Ulama Council

Personal details
- Party: Rashtriya Ulama Council
- Education: Islamic University of Madinah, Jameatur Rashad
- Profession: Educationists, Politician, Islamic Cleric
- Website: www.ulamacouncil.org

Aamir Rashadi Madni is an Indian politician, cleric and educator. He is a graduate from Madinah University. At present he runs various educational institutions in Azamgarh, Uttar Pradesh under the patronage of Jameatur Rashad and also does social work. He is also the founder and national president of a political party Rashtriya Ulama Council (RUC) which has a strong hold specially in Uttar Pradesh and is working in 14 other states of India like Delhi, Maharashtra, Uttar Pradesh, Bihar, Tamil Nadu. The party has participated in general and assembly elections in many of these states.

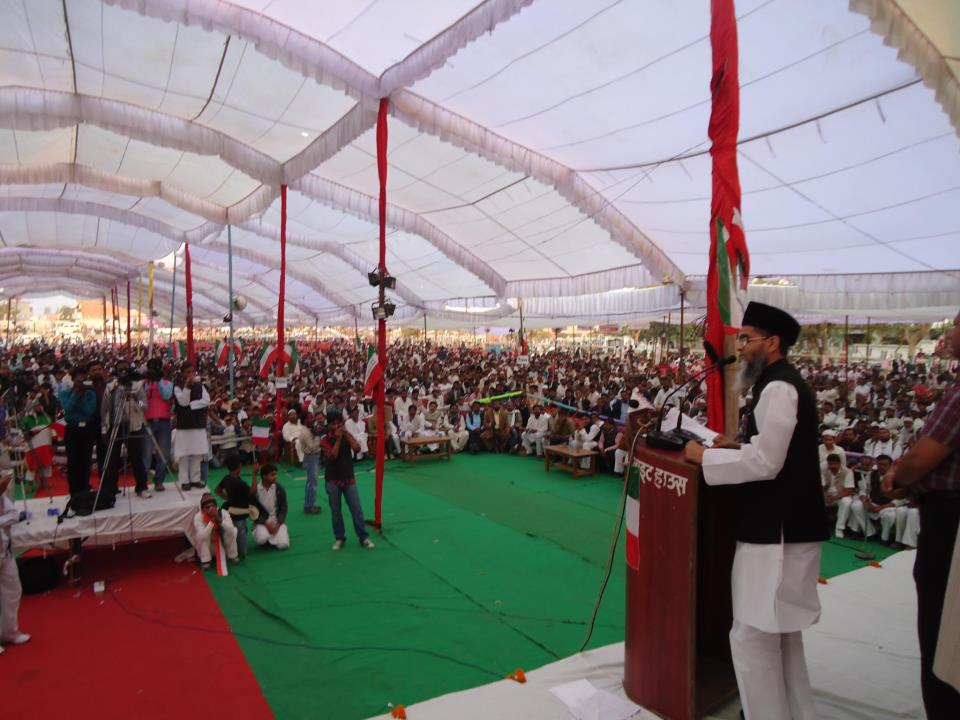
Maulana Aamir Rashadi Madni, President of Rashtriya Ulama Council

Rashtriya Ulama Council or RUC was founded as a "Public Movement" against the backdrop of the Batla House encounter in Azamgarh district of Uttar Pradesh. Maulana Aamir Rashdi is the founder President of RUC. As Maulana quotes, "For 66 years, Muslims have been a mere vote bank for political parties, just the way dalits are. Others attract Muslims votes by instilling the fear of Sangh (RSS) or BJP or Modi, as is the case now. It is high time Muslims created their political leadership." He has even fought the 2014 Loksabha Elections from Azamgarh against Mulayam Singh Yadav, the founder of Samajwadi Party stating that it's a fight for justice. Maulana is known for his statements in favour of the marginalized sections of the society specially the Minorities and other oppressed classes. He has led many mass movements on Muslim Reservation, Illegal detention of the Innocents, Article 341, Triple Talaq.
