= R. S. Munirathinam =

Indian politician

Ravilla S. Munirathinam is an Indian politician and former Member of the Legislative Assembly of Tamil Nadu. He was elected to the Tamil Nadu legislative assembly from Gummidipundi constituency as an Anna Dravida Munnetra Kazhagam candidate in 1977, 1980, and 1984 elections. He is the founder of the RMK Group of Educational Institutions, which constitutes the major engineering colleges RMK Engineering College, RMD Engineering College and RMK College of Engineering and Technology resided at Kavaraipettai.They also run a residential school affiliated to the CBSE and Sri durgadevi polytechnic college. They have also established a day school in the name of RMK School at Thiruverkadu near Chennai.He have one son named R.M.Kishore and a daughter R.M.Durga Devi

== Electoral performance ==
1996 Tamil Nadu Legislative Assembly election: Gummidipoondi
Party	Candidate	Votes	%	±%
DMK	K. Venu	61,946	49.69	+24.44
AIADMK	R. S. Munirathinam	40,321	32.34	−22.43
PMK	Jayavelu Durai	17,648	14.16	New
MDMK	M. Natarajan	2,454	1.97	New
BJP	M. Bhaskaran	788	0.63	−1.11
Margin of victory		21,625	17.35	−12.18
Turnout		1,24,675	71.26	1.75
Registered electors		1,83,842		
DMK gain from AIADMK		Swing	-5.09	

1984 Tamil Nadu Legislative Assembly election: Gummidipoondi
Party	Candidate	Votes	%	±%
AIADMK	R. S. Munirathinam	55,221	55.56	+6.56
DMK	K. A. Vezhavendan	43,174	43.44	+3.6
Independent	K. Palani	989	1.00	New
Margin of victory		12,047	12.12	2.96
Turnout		99,384	78.49	10.53
Registered electors		1,34,311		
AIADMK hold		Swing	6.56	

1980 Tamil Nadu Legislative Assembly election: Gummidipoondi
Party	Candidate	Votes	%	±%
AIADMK	R. S. Munirathinam	41,845	49.01	+6.75
DMK	K. Venu	34,019	39.84	+23.97
JP	M. Parandaman	9,523	11.15	New
Margin of victory		7,826	9.17	−5.57
Turnout		85,387	67.97	4.12
Registered electors		1,27,863		
AIADMK hold		Swing	6.75	

1977 Tamil Nadu Legislative Assembly election: Gummidipoondi
Party	Candidate	Votes	%	±%
AIADMK	R. S. Munirathinam	32,309	42.26	New
JP	G. Kamalam Bujammal	21,042	27.52	New
DMK	K. Venu	12,135	15.87	−42.53
INC	K. Venkatasubbaraju	7,782	10.18	−31.42
Independent	E. Vinayagam	1,436	1.88	New
Independent	S. Elumalai	1,148	1.50	New
Independent	T. Mohamad Alikhan	604	0.79	New
Margin of victory		11,267	14.74	−2.08
Turnout		76,456	63.84	−13.86
Registered electors		1,21,875		
AIADMK gain from DMK		Swing	-16.15	
