= Pyarimohan Mohapatra =

Indian politician (1940–2017)

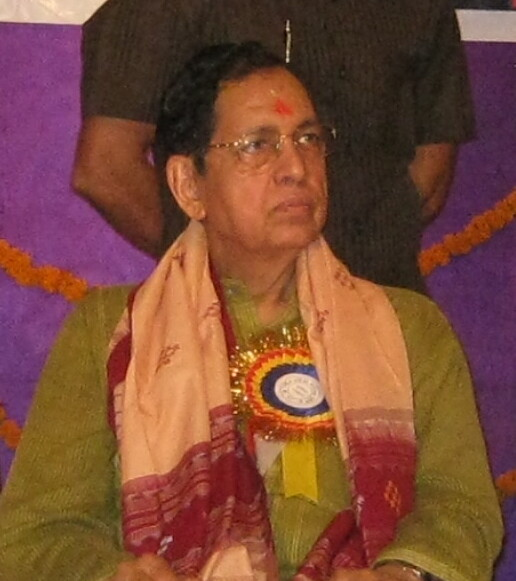

MP of Rajya Sabha for Odisha
- In office 2 July 2004 – 1 July 2016
- Constituency: Odisha

Personal details
- Born: 25 January 1940 Talcher, Angul district, Odisha
- Died: 19 March 2017 (aged 77) Mumbai, Maharashtra, India
- Party: OJM; Independent in Rajya Sabha
- Other political affiliations: Biju Janata Dal
- Spouse: Pratibha Mohapatra
- Children: 2 sons and 2 daughters
- As of 22 November 2010

Pyarimohan Mohapatra (25 January 1940 – 19 March 2017) was a politician from the Odisha Jana Morcha as a member of the Parliament of India representing Odisha in the Rajya Sabha, the upper house of the Indian Parliament. He was the political advisor of Naveen Patnaik. He started his career as an IAS officer and was principal secretary to Biju Patnaik. He was considered as the 'Chanakya' of Orissa politics, mastermind and the proxy leader of the Biju Janata Dal.

He was suspended from the Biju Janata Dal, following an alleged coup attempt against Chief Minister Naveen Patnaik in June 2012, while the chief minister was in London. 1 BJD MP Pyari Mohan Mohapatra, resigned as the party's parliamentary group leader in Rajya Sabha on 4 August 2012. He attributed his resignation to absence of communication between him and BJD president and Odisha Chief Minister Naveen Patnaik. He founded OJM (Odisha Jana Morcha) as a rebel party and fought in the 2014 state elections without much success. After spending 8 months at the Hinduja Hospital in Mumbai in a critical condition, the "Chanakya of Odisha politics" died on 19 March 2017.
