= Nowhera Shaik =

Indian entrepreneur and politician (born 1973)

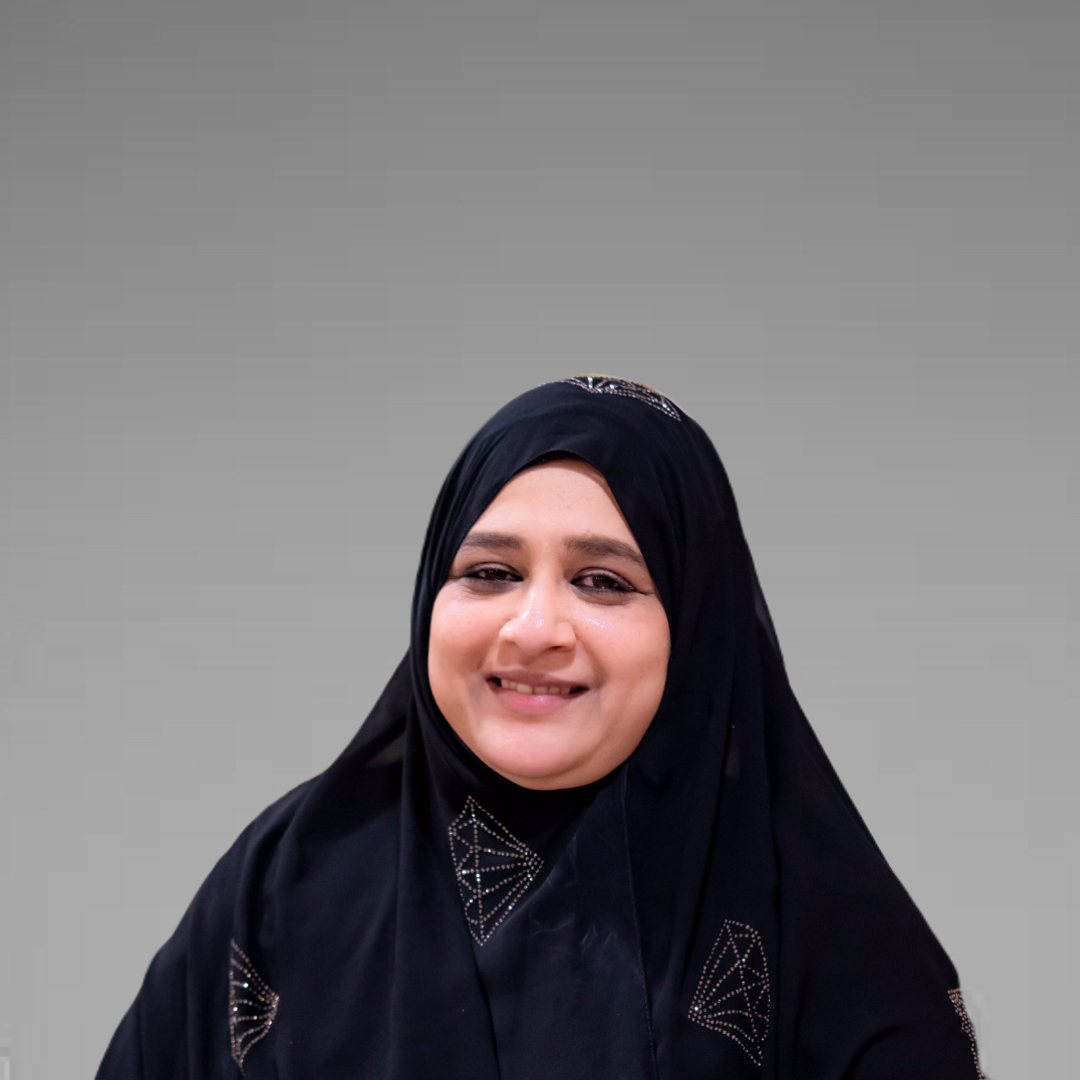
- Nowhera Shaik

CEO of Heera Group of Companies
- Incumbent
- Assumed office 1998

President of the All India Mahila Empowerment Party
- Incumbent
- Assumed office 2017
- Preceded by: Position Established

Personal details
- Born: 21 September 1973 (age 53) Tirupati, Andhra Pradesh, India
- Website: nowherashaik.blog

Aalima Nowhera Shaik is an Indian entrepreneur and politician who has been accused of serious offences under the Prevention of Money Laundering Act and under investigation by the Serious Fraud Investigation Office. She is the executive chairperson and founder of Heera Group and founder and current president of the All India Mahila Empowerment Party.

On 28th may 2025, Nowhera Shaik was arrested in Faridabad Haryana for being involved in scamming UAE expats. The arrest was done by Hyderabad Central Crime Station led by the team of N Shwetha Reddy (DCP CCS), Harish Kumar (ACP CCS), Sonta Ravi Kumar (Sub Inspector, CCS), Hyderabad Central Crime Station (CCS).

== Heera Group ==
As per its website, Heera Group claimed that it was a company with diversified operations in various sectors including gold imports, gold trading, textiles, jewellery, mineral water, granite, tours and travels, real estate and e-commerce. Heera Mart, the group's shopping mall is located at Kukatpally, Hyderabad. Earlier in the month of September 2024, the Crime Investigation Department (CID) of Andhra Pradesh apprehended Shaik in Chittoor following multiple complaints across the state. She faces charges of fraud, breach of trust, and intimidation. Shaik has encountered similar allegations in several other states, including Maharashtra, Karnataka, Delhi, and Kerala, where she allegedly breached regulations while expanding her business and collecting substantial deposits.

Nowhera Shaik, accused in the Heera Gold scam, was arrested by Warangal police on Sunday after a non-bailable warrant (NBW) was executed by the Warangal Principal District and Sessions Judge court. The NBW stemmed from a 2021 case where three victims alleged losses of ₹33 lakh in Heera Gold’s investment scheme

== Controversies ==
In 2018 Shaik was arrested for allegedly running a Ponzi scheme assuring returns of 36% per year for the investment under the disguise of Heera Group and the total amount involved was more than ₹5000 crore from 1.72 lakh investors. In 2019 she was arrested by Crime Investigation Department (CID) police of Andhra Pradesh after a series of complaints in the state. CID charged her with the cases like criminal intimidation, cheating and criminal breach of trust. Investors were dissatisfied with the pace of investigation and even demand action on her supporters too in the scam case.

The Enforcement Directorate (ED) on Saturday carried out searches at the offices of Heera Group of companies and properties of Nowhera Sheikh, the group’s founder. The agency conducted simultaneous raids at different locations from Saturday morning. During the raids, the ED reportedly seized property documents and papers relating to financial transactions. Earlier, the agency had conducted searches in Hyderabad in connection with a case registered against Heera Group and provisionally attached properties worth Rs 400 crore owned by the group.

The ED is investigating a case against the Heera Group of Companies under the Prevention of Money Laundering Act.

Heera Group has been accused of cheating lakhs of investors by collecting thousands of crores in investments on the promise of providing high returns. The Ponzi scheme was carried out in the name of Heera Gold Trading.

A First Information Report (FIR) has been filed by a benagaluru based software company 1help Technology & Software Solutions Pvt Ltd against Heera Group CEO Nowhera Shaik and her 5th husband Sameer Khan for threatening the company directors Mohammed Akheel and Mohammed Muneeb Khan for not repaying their due amount in Banjara Hills Police station of Hyderabad.

On 23 August 2024, Supreme court orders Shaik to repay the 580 crore rupees to the investors which court subjected her in financial fraud to the Muslim community at the name of interest free banking and halal activity. Supreme court clearly orders her either to repay the amount by 18 October 2024 or go to jail.

== Money laundering cases ==
Serious Fraud Investigation Office of the Government of India has issued a notice to Heera Group in this matter.

== Political life ==
On 16 November 2017, Shaik founded the All India Mahila Empowerment Party. The party contested the 2018 Karnataka Legislative Assembly election and fielded candidates for all 224 constituencies, garnering 0.3% vote share. The party contested from all the 119 constituencies in the 2018 Telangana Legislative Assembly election and aims to contest in the 2019 Indian general election.

In 2016, a complaint was filed against Heera Group by Asaduddin Owaisi alleging that a number of investors from his constituency Hyderabad were cheated but was granted bail by the court on the condition to return investors' amount.

In 2018, Gulf News reported that Nowhera Shaik used photo-editing software to create fake awards for herself to gain the trust of potential investors.
