= K. S. Thennarasu =

Former Member of Tamil Nadu Legislative Assembly

Member of Tamil Nadu Legislative Assembly
- In office 19 May 2016 – 2 May 2021
- Preceded by: V. C. Chandhirakumar
- Succeeded by: Thirumagan Evera
- Constituency: Erode East
- In office 13 May 2001 – 11 May 2006
- Preceded by: N. K. K. Periasamy
- Succeeded by: N. K. K. P. Raajah
- Constituency: Erode

Personal details
- Political party: All India Anna Dravida Munnetra Kazhagam

K. S. Thennarasu is an Indian politician and former Member of the Legislative Assembly of Tamil Nadu. He was elected twice to the Tamil Nadu legislative assembly as an All India Anna Dravida Munnetra Kazhagam candidate from Erode Assembly constituency in 2001 and Erode East Assembly constituency in 2016.

== Elections contested and positions held ==
| Elections | Constituency | Party | Result | Votes | Vote percentage |
|---|---|---|---|---|---|
| 2001 | Erode | AIADMK | Won | 95,450 | 52.40% |
| 2016 | Erode (East) | AIADMK | Won | 64,879 | 44.77% |
| 2023 by-election | Erode (East) | AIADMK | Lost | 43,923 | 25.75% |
