= V. C. Chandhirakumar =

Indian politician

Member of Tamil Nadu Legislative Assembly
- In office 9 February 2025 – 4 May 2026
- Preceded by: E. V. K. S. Elangovan
- Succeeded by: M. Vijay Balaji
- Constituency: Erode East
- In office 13 May 2011 – 19 May 2016
- Preceded by: constituency established
- Succeeded by: K. S. Thennarasu
- Constituency: Erode East

Personal details
- Party: Dravida Munnetra Kazhagam
- Other political affiliations: Desiya Murpokku Dravida Kazhagam (2011-2016); Makkal Desiya Murpokku Dravida Kazhagam (2016-)

V. Chokkalingam Chandhirakumar (born 1967) is an Indian politician from Tamil Nadu. A member of the Dravida Munnetra Kazhagam, he is a member of the 16th Tamil Nadu Legislative Assembly, representing the Erode East Assembly constituency, since 9 February 2025. He earlier served as a member of the 14th Tamil Nadu Legislative Assembly, representing the Desiya Murpokku Dravida Kazhagam, from 2011 to 2016.

== Early life and education ==
Chandhirakumar was born in Erode to R. Chokkalingam. He studied till class X at Sengunthar Higher Secondary School, and passed the S.S.L.C. examinations in 1982. He is involved in real estate business.

== Career ==
Chandhirakumar served as a member of the 14th Tamil Nadu Legislative Assembly, representing the Desiya Murpokku Dravida Kazhagam, from 2011 to 2016. He won the 2011 Tamil Nadu Legislative Assembly election from the Erode East Assembly constituency after defeating his nearest rival S. Muthusamy of the Dravida Munnetra Kazhagam (DMK) by a margin of 10,644 votes. He lost the 2016 Tamil Nadu Legislative Assembly election from the same constituency to K. S. Thennarasu of the All India Anna Dravida Munnetra Kazhagam (AIADMK) by a margin of 7,794 votes. He later shifted to the DMK, and won from the same constituency, in the by-elections held in February 2025. He won the by-elections by a margin of 91,558 votes over his nearest rival M.K. Seethalakshmi of the Naam Tamilar Katchi, after the major opposition parties including the AIADMK boycotted the election.
