= K. S. Vijayakumar =

Indian politician

Member of the Tamil Nadu Legislative Assembly
- In office 20 May 2016 – 2 May 2021
- Preceded by: C. H. Sekar
- Succeeded by: T. J. Govindrajan
- Constituency: Gummidipoondi
- In office 16 May 2005 – 14 May 2011
- Preceded by: K. Sudarsanam
- Succeeded by: C. H. Sekar
- Constituency: Gummidipoondi

Personal details
- Party: All India Anna Dravida Munnetra Kazhagam

K. S. Vijayakumar is a politician from Tamil Nadu, India. He was elected from the Gummidipundi constituency to the Fifteenth Tamil Nadu Legislative Assembly as a member of the All India Anna Dravida Munnetra Kazhagam political party in the 2016 Tamil Nadu legislative assembly elections.

== Electoral performance ==
2016 Tamil Nadu Legislative Assembly election: Gummidipoondi
Party	Candidate	Votes	%	±%
AIADMK	K. S. Vijayakumar	89,332	41.68	New
DMK	C. H. Sekar	65,937	30.76	New
PMK	M. Selvaraj	43,055	20.09	−18.02
DMDK	K. Geetha	6,585	3.07	−51.33
BJP	M. Bhaskaran	2,092	0.98	−0.07
NOTA	NOTA	1,484	0.69	New
BSP	M. Murali Krishna (A) Samaran	1,282	0.60	New
NTK	S. Sureshkumar	1,250	0.58	New
Margin of victory		23,395	10.91	−5.37
Turnout		2,14,348	82.15	−1.22
Registered electors		2,60,912		
AIADMK gain from DMDK		Swing	-12.72	

2006 Tamil Nadu Legislative Assembly election: Gummidipoondi
Party	Candidate	Votes	%	±%
AIADMK	K. S. Vijayakumar	63,147	40.41	−15.66
PMK	Durai Jeyavelu	62,918	40.26	New
DMDK	C. H. Sekar	21,738	13.91	New
Independent	R. Sekar	2,147	1.37	New
SP	K. Sekar	1,096	0.70	New
Margin of victory		229	0.15	−18.90
Turnout		1,56,263	79.96	17.38
Registered electors		1,95,425		
AIADMK hold		Swing	-15.66	

2005 Tamil Nadu by-election: Gummidipoondi
Party	Candidate	Votes	%	±%
AIADMK	K. S. Vijayakumar	83,717	56.94	▲0.87
DMK	Venkatachalapathy P.	56,554	38.47	▲1.45
JD(U)	Viduthalai Chezian C.K.	2,926	2.00	New
Independent	Venkatesan G	1,724	0.45	New
Independent	Venkatesan R	663	0.14	New
Margin of victory		27,163	18.47	▼0.58
Turnout		1,47,016		
Registered electors				
AIADMK hold		Swing		
