= C. H. Sekar =

Indian politician

C.H.Sekar.
- Occupations: Politician and businessman.
- Years active: 2004–present
- Website: chsekar.com

C.H.Sekar is an Indian politician and was a member of the Fourteenth Tamil Nadu Legislative Assembly representing Gummidipundi Constituency from 2011.

== Background ==
Sekar was born in 1979. He is an entrepreneur and has various businesses. He holds a degree in mechanical engineering.

== Political career ==
He represented Gummidipoondi assembly constituency as a Vijayakant’s DMDK Party candidate in the 2011 TN Legislative Assembly. He left DMDK and joined the Dravida Munnetra Kazhagam and was appointed the Deputy Secretary of the Party’s IT Wing. After being denied a United States visa he decided to enter politics.

== Electoral performance ==
2016 Tamil Nadu Legislative Assembly election: Gummidipoondi
Party	Candidate	Votes	%	±%
AIADMK	K. S. Vijayakumar	89,332	41.68	New
DMK	C. H. Sekar	65,937	30.76	New
PMK	M. Selvaraj	43,055	20.09	−18.02
DMDK	K. Geetha	6,585	3.07	−51.33
BJP	M. Bhaskaran	2,092	0.98	−0.07
NOTA	NOTA	1,484	0.69	New
BSP	M. Murali Krishna (A) Samaran	1,282	0.60	New
NTK	S. Sureshkumar	1,250	0.58	New
Margin of victory		23,395	10.91	−5.37
Turnout		2,14,348	82.15	−1.22
Registered electors		2,60,912		
AIADMK gain from DMDK		Swing	-12.72	

2011 Tamil Nadu Legislative Assembly election: Gummidipoondi
Party	Candidate	Votes	%	±%
DMDK	C. H. Sekar	97,708	54.40	+40.49
PMK	K. N. Sekar	68,452	38.11	−2.15
Independent	R. Selvakumar	1,892	1.05	New
BJP	B. Chakravarthi Sriraman	1,883	1.05	New
JMM	G. Munikrishnan	1,836	1.02	New
Independent	N. Velu	1,462	0.81	New
Puratchi Bharatham	G. Asokan	1,425	0.79	New
Independent	A. Raja	1,411	0.79	New
RPI	M. Sudhakar	1,228	0.68	New
Independent	P. Shanmugam	997	0.56	New
Margin of victory		29,256	16.29	16.14
Turnout		1,79,616	83.37	3.41
Registered electors		2,15,443		
DMDK gain from AIADMK		Swing	13.99	

2006 Tamil Nadu Legislative Assembly election: Gummidipoondi
Party	Candidate	Votes	%	±%
AIADMK	K. S. Vijayakumar	63,147	40.41	−15.66
PMK	Durai Jeyavelu	62,918	40.26	New
DMDK	C. H. Sekar	21,738	13.91	New
Independent	R. Sekar	2,147	1.37	New
SP	K. Sekar	1,096	0.70	New
Margin of victory		229	0.15	−18.90
Turnout		1,56,263	79.96	17.38
Registered electors		1,95,425		
AIADMK hold		Swing	-15.66	
