= K. Venu (Tamil Nadu politician) =

Indian politician

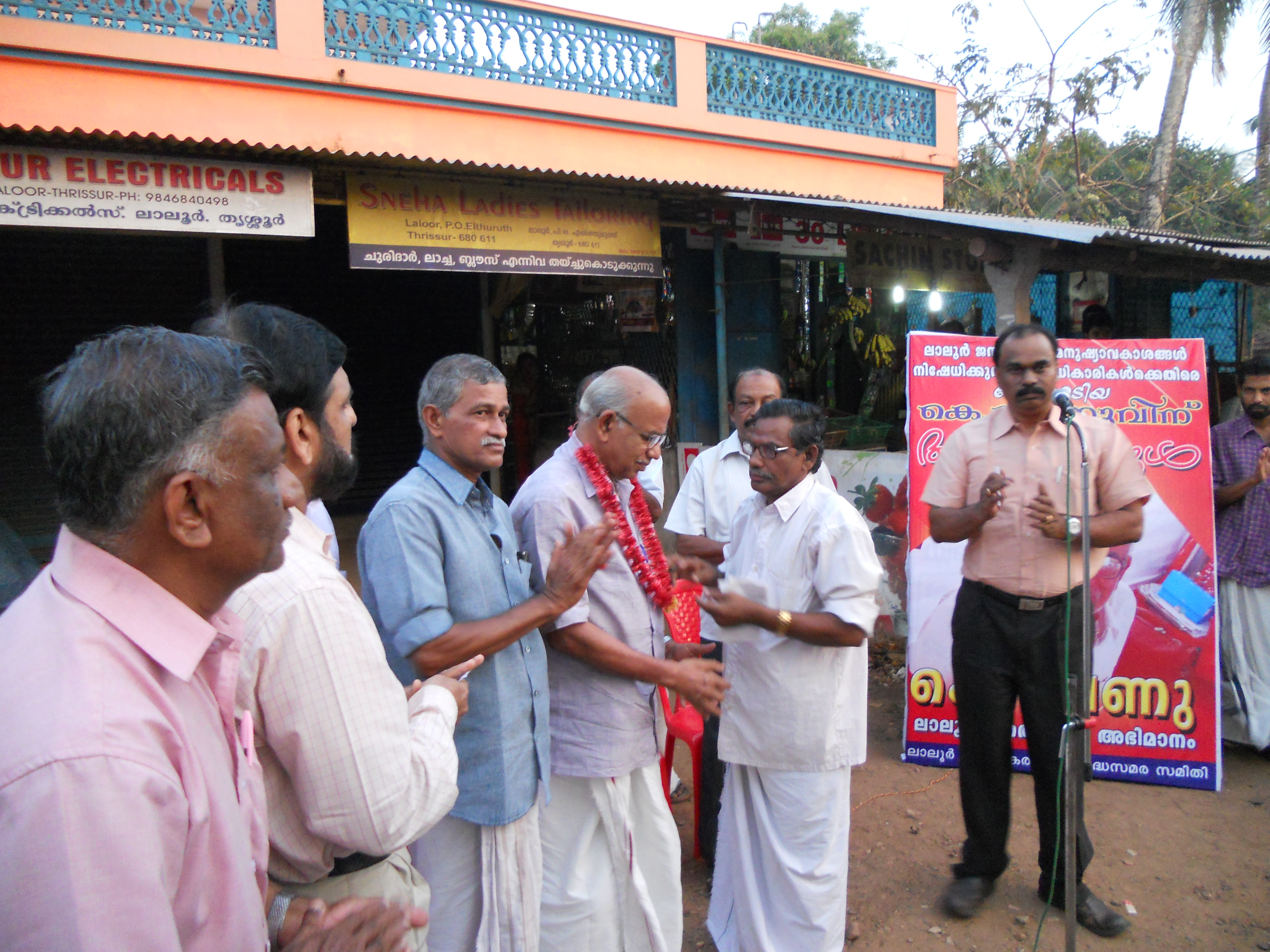
K. Venu in Laloor strike

K. Venu is an Indian politician and former Member of the Legislative Assembly of Tamil Nadu. He was elected to the Tamil Nadu legislative assembly from Gummidipundi constituency as a Dravida Munnetra Kazhagam candidate in 1989, and 1996 elections.
