= Gummidipoondi Assembly constituency =

State Legislative Assembly Constituency in Tamil Nadu

Coordinates: 13.40665°N 80.12380°E

Gummidipoondi
- Constituency No. 1 for the Tamil Nadu Legislative Assembly

Constituency details
- Country: India
- Region: South India
- State: Tamil Nadu
- District: Thiruvallur
- Lok Sabha constituency: Thiruvallur
- Established: 1957
- Total electors: 254,129
- Reservation: None

Member of Legislative Assembly
- 17th Tamil Nadu Legislative Assembly
- Incumbent Vijayakumar
- Party: Thamizhaga Vetri Kazhagam
- Alliance: TVK+
- Elected year: 2026

Gummidipoondi is a state assembly constituency in Tiruvallur district in Tamil Nadu. Its State Assembly Constituency number is 1. It consists of the Gummidipundi and Uthukkottai taluks. It falls under Thiruvallur Lok Sabha constituency. It is one of the 234 State Legislative Assembly Constituencies in Tamil Nadu.

== Members of the Legislative Assembly ==
Election	Member	Party
1957	G. Kamalam Bujammal	Indian National Congress
1962	A. Ragahava Reddy	Swatantra Party
1967	K. A. Vezhavendan	Dravida Munnetra Kazhagam
1971	K. A. Vezhavendan	Dravida Munnetra Kazhagam
1977	R. S. Munirathinam	All India Anna Dravida Munnetra Kazhagam
1980	R. S. Munirathinam	All India Anna Dravida Munnetra Kazhagam
1984	R. S. Munirathinam	All India Anna Dravida Munnetra Kazhagam
1989	K. Venu	Dravida Munnetra Kazhagam
1991	R. Sakkubai	All India Anna Dravida Munnetra Kazhagam
1996	K. Venu	Dravida Munnetra Kazhagam
2001	K. Sudarsanam	All India Anna Dravida Munnetra Kazhagam
2005 By-election (Note: Due to death of Sudarsanam.)	K. S. Vijayakumar	All India Anna Dravida Munnetra Kazhagam
2006	K. S. Vijayakumar	All India Anna Dravida Munnetra Kazhagam
2011	C. H. Sekar	Desiya Murpokku Dravida Kazhagam
2016	K. S. Vijayakumar	All India Anna Dravida Munnetra Kazhagam
2021	T. J. Govindrajan	Dravida Munnetra Kazhagam
2026	S. Vijayakumar	Tamilaga Vettri Kazhagam

Madras State

== Election results ==
Vote share of winning candidates
2026	40.56%
2021	57.40%
2016	41.68%
2011	54.40%
2006	40.41%
2001	56.07%
1996	49.69%
1991	54.77%
1989	37.33%
1984	55.56%
1980	49.01%
1977	42.26%
1971	58.41%
1967	52.57%
1962	46.50%
1957	26.70%

=== 2026 ===
2026 Tamil Nadu Legislative Assembly election : Gummidipoondi
Party	Candidate	Votes	%	±%
TVK	S. Vijayakumar	94,320	40.56%	New
AIADMK	Sudhakar. V	66,375	28.55%	New
DMK	T. J. Govindrajan	62,492	26.88%	▼30.52
NTK	R. Sridar. B. L.,	4,756	2.05%	▼3.26
NOTA	None of the above	937	0.40%	▼0.41
Margin of victory		27,945	12.02%	▼11.10
Turnout		232,630	91.52%	▲12.64
Total valid votes		232,522		
Registered electors		254,175		▼9.77
TVK gain from DMK		Swing	▼16.84	

=== 2021 ===
2021 Tamil Nadu Legislative Assembly election : Gummidipoondi
Party	Candidate	Votes	%	±%
DMK	T. J. Govindrajan	126,452	57.40%	▲26.64
PMK	M. Prakash	75,514	34.28%	▲14.19
NTK	Usha	11,701	5.31%	▲4.73
DMDK	K. M. Dilliy	2,576	1.17%	▼1.90
NOTA	None of the above	1,783	0.81%	▲0.12
Margin of victory		50,938	23.12%	▲12.21
Turnout		222,192	78.88%	▼3.28
Total valid votes		220,286		
Rejected ballots		123	0.06%	▲0.06
Registered electors		281,688		▲7.96
DMK gain from AIADMK		Swing	▲15.72	

=== 2016 ===
2016 Tamil Nadu Legislative Assembly election : Gummidipoondi
Party	Candidate	Votes	%	±%
AIADMK	K. S. Vijayakumar	89,332	41.68%	New
DMK	C. H. Sekar	65,937	30.76%	New
PMK	M. Selvaraj	43,055	20.09%	▼18.02
DMDK	K. Geetha	6,585	3.07%	▼51.33
BJP	M. Bhaskaran	2,092	0.98%	▼0.07
NOTA	None of the above	1,484	0.69%	New
Margin of victory		23,395	10.91%	▼5.38
Turnout		214,354	82.16%	▼1.26
Total valid votes		214,348		
Rejected ballots		6	0.00%	▼0.06
Registered electors		260,912		▲21.10
AIADMK gain from DMDK		Swing	▼12.72	

=== 2011 ===
2011 Tamil Nadu Legislative Assembly election : Gummidipoondi
Party	Candidate	Votes	%	±%
DMDK	C. H. Sekar	97,708	54.40%	▲40.49
PMK	K. N. Sekar	68,452	38.11%	▼2.15
Independent	R. Selvakumar	1,892	1.05%	
BJP	B. Chakravarthi Sriraman	1,883	1.05%	▲0.63
JMM	G. Munikrishnan	1,836	1.02%	New
Independent	N. Velu	1,462	0.81%	
Puratchi Bharatham	G. Asokan	1,425	0.79%	New
Independent	A. Raja	1,411	0.79%	
RPI	M. Sudhakar	1,228	0.68%	New
Margin of victory		29,256	16.29%	▲16.14
Turnout		179,722	83.42%	▲3.46
Total valid votes		179,616		
Rejected ballots		106	0.06%	▲0.06
Registered electors		215,443		▲10.24
DMDK gain from AIADMK		Swing	▲13.99	

=== 2006 ===
2006 Tamil Nadu Legislative Assembly election : Gummidipoondi
Party	Candidate	Votes	%	±%
AIADMK	K. S. Vijayakumar	63,147	40.41%	▼16.53
PMK	Durai Jeyavelu	62,918	40.26%	New
DMDK	C. H. Sekar	21,738	13.91%	New
Independent	R. Sekar	2,147	1.37%	
SP	K. Sekar	1,096	0.70%	New
Margin of victory		229	0.15%	▼18.33
Turnout		156,263	79.96%	▲3.91
Total valid votes		156,263		
Registered electors		195,425		▲1.08
AIADMK hold		Swing		

=== Assembly by-election 2005 ===
2005 Tamil Nadu Legislative Assembly by-election : Gummidipoondi
Party	Candidate	Votes	%	±%
AIADMK	K. S. Vijayakumar	83,717	56.94%	New
DMK	Venkatachalapathy. P	56,554	38.47%	▲1.45
JD(U)	Baskaran (A)viduthalai Chezian. C. K	2,926	1.99%	New
Independent	Venkatesan. G	1,724	1.17%	
Margin of victory		27,163	18.48%	▼0.57
Turnout		147,032	76.05%	▲13.46
Total valid votes		147,016		
Registered electors		193,346		▼7.70
AIADMK gain from AIADMK		Swing	▲0.87	

=== 2001 ===
2001 Tamil Nadu Legislative Assembly election : Gummidipoondi
Party	Candidate	Votes	%	±%
AIADMK	K. Sudarsanam	73,467	56.07%	▲23.73
DMK	K. Venu	48,509	37.02%	▼12.67
Puratchi Bharatham	E. Nedunchezhian	2,376	1.81%	New
MDMK	R. Balaji	2,311	1.76%	▼0.21
NCP	J. Isabella John	1,613	1.23%	New
Independent	P. T. Vausuthevan	1,220	0.93%	
Margin of victory		24,958	19.05%	▲1.70
Turnout		131,096	62.59%	▼8.67
Total valid votes		131,019		
Rejected ballots		77	0.06%	▼4.71
Registered electors		209,468		▲13.94
AIADMK gain from DMK		Swing	▲6.38	

=== 1996 ===
1996 Tamil Nadu Legislative Assembly election : Gummidipoondi
Party	Candidate	Votes	%	±%
DMK	K. Venu	61,946	49.69%	▲24.45
AIADMK	R. S. Munirathinam	40,321	32.34%	New
PMK	Durai Jeyavelu	17,648	14.16%	▼2.27
MDMK	M. Natarajan	2,454	1.97%	New
BJP	M. Bhaskaran	788	0.63%	▼1.11
Margin of victory		21,625	17.35%	▼12.18
Turnout		131,014	71.26%	▲1.75
Total valid votes		124,675		
Rejected ballots		6,253	4.77%	▼0.27
Registered electors		183,842		▲8.85
DMK gain from AIADMK		Swing	▼5.08	

=== 1991 ===
1991 Tamil Nadu Legislative Assembly election : Gummidipoondi
Party	Candidate	Votes	%	±%
AIADMK	R. Sakkubai	61,063	54.77%	New
DMK	K. Venu	28,144	25.24%	▼12.09
PMK	S. Manoharah	18,321	16.43%	New
BJP	P. Sukumar	1,943	1.74%	New
Margin of victory		32,919	29.53%	▲25.95
Turnout		117,401	69.51%	▲3.15
Total valid votes		111,484		
Rejected ballots		5,917	5.04%	▲2.87
Registered electors		168,898		▲11.22
AIADMK gain from DMK		Swing	▲17.44	

=== 1989 ===
1989 Tamil Nadu Legislative Assembly election : Gummidipoondi
Party	Candidate	Votes	%	±%
DMK	K. Venu	36,803	37.33%	▼6.11
AIADMK	K. Gopal	33,273	33.75%	New
INC	C. R. Dhasarathan	13,420	13.61%	New
AIADMK	R. S. Munirathinam	12,543	12.72%	New
Independent	V. Selvaraj	1,240	1.26%	
Independent	D. Arivalagan	723	0.73%	
Margin of victory		3,530	3.58%	▼8.54
Turnout		100,774	66.36%	▼12.13
Total valid votes		98,590		
Rejected ballots		2,184	2.17%	▼3.56
Registered electors		151,862		▲13.07
DMK gain from AIADMK		Swing	▼18.23	

=== 1984 ===
1984 Tamil Nadu Legislative Assembly election : Gummidipoondi
Party	Candidate	Votes	%	±%
AIADMK	R. S. Munirathinam	55,221	55.56%	▲6.55
DMK	K. A. Vezhavendan	43,174	43.44%	▲3.60
Independent	K. Palani	989	1.00%	
Margin of victory		12,047	12.12%	▲2.95
Turnout		105,425	78.49%	▲10.52
Total valid votes		99,384		
Rejected ballots		6,041	5.73%	▲3.98
Registered electors		134,311		▲5.04
AIADMK hold		Swing		

=== 1980 ===
1980 Tamil Nadu Legislative Assembly election : Gummidipoondi
Party	Candidate	Votes	%	±%
AIADMK	R. S. Munirathinam	41,845	49.01%	New
DMK	K. Venu	34,019	39.84%	▲23.97
JP	M. Parandaman	9,523	11.15%	New
Margin of victory		7,826	9.17%	▼5.57
Turnout		86,905	67.97%	▲4.13
Total valid votes		85,387		
Rejected ballots		1,518	1.75%	▲0.01
Registered electors		127,863		▲4.91
AIADMK gain from AIADMK		Swing	▲6.75	

=== 1977 ===
1977 Tamil Nadu Legislative Assembly election : Gummidipoondi
Party	Candidate	Votes	%	±%
AIADMK	R. S. Munirathinam	32,309	42.26%	New
JP	G. Kamalam Bujammal	21,042	27.52%	New
DMK	K. Venu	12,135	15.87%	▼42.54
INC	K. Venkatasubbaraju	7,782	10.18%	New
Independent	E. Vinayagam	1,436	1.88%	
Independent	S. Elumalai	1,148	1.50%	
Independent	T. Mohamad Alikhan	604	0.79%	
Margin of victory		11,267	14.74%	▼2.07
Turnout		77,810	63.84%	▼13.86
Total valid votes		76,456		
Rejected ballots		1,354	1.74%	▲1.74
Registered electors		121,875		▲23.21
AIADMK gain from DMK		Swing	▼16.15	

=== 1971 ===
1971 Tamil Nadu Legislative Assembly election : Gummidipoondi
Party	Candidate	Votes	%	±%
DMK	K. A. Vezhavendan	43,355	58.41%	▲5.84
INC	P. Obul Reddy	30,875	41.59%	New
Margin of victory		12,480	16.81%	▲10.42
Turnout		76,864	77.70%	▲2.29
Total valid votes		74,230		
Registered electors		98,918		▲5.00
DMK hold		Swing		

=== 1967 ===
1967 Madras State Legislative Assembly election : Gummidipoondi
Party	Candidate	Votes	%	±%
DMK	K. A. Vezhavendan	35,887	52.57%	New
INC	G. Kamalam Bujammal	31,527	46.19%	▲1.18
Independent	A. V. J. Natcker	848	1.24%	
Margin of victory		4,360	6.39%	▲4.90
Turnout		71,042	75.41%	▲16.80
Total valid votes		68,262		
Registered electors		94,205		▲24.68
DMK gain from SWA		Swing	▲6.07	

=== 1962 ===
1962 Madras State Legislative Assembly election : Gummidipoondi
Party	Candidate	Votes	%	±%
SWA	A. Ragahava Reddy	19,575	46.50%	New
INC	G. Kamalam Bujammal	18,946	45.01%	▲18.31
Independent	G. Peddaiya	3,576	8.49%	
Margin of victory		629	1.49%	▲1.21
Turnout		44,287	58.61%	▲14.17
Total valid votes		42,097		
Registered electors		75,560		▼0.40
SWA gain from INC		Swing	▲19.80	

=== 1957 ===
1957 Madras State Legislative Assembly election : Gummidipoondi
Party	Candidate	Votes	%	±%
INC	G. Kamalam Bujammal	9,002	26.70%	New
Independent	Venugopal Reddi	8,908	26.42%	New
Independent	Dushyanthulu Raji	7,768	23.04%	New
Independent	Marimuthu	3,998	11.86%	New
Independent	T. V. Jeevarathnam	3,152	9.35%	New
Independent	G. T. Kanniah Naidu	888	2.63%	New
Margin of victory		94	0.28%	
Turnout		33,716	44.44%	
Total valid votes		33,716		
Registered electors		75,865		
INC win (new seat)				
