= Rashtriya Ulama Council =

Rashtriya Ulama Council (RUC)
- President: Aamir Rashadi Madni
- Spokesperson: Talha Aamir Rashadi
- Founded: 4 October 2008
- Newspaper: RUC Awaaz

Party flag
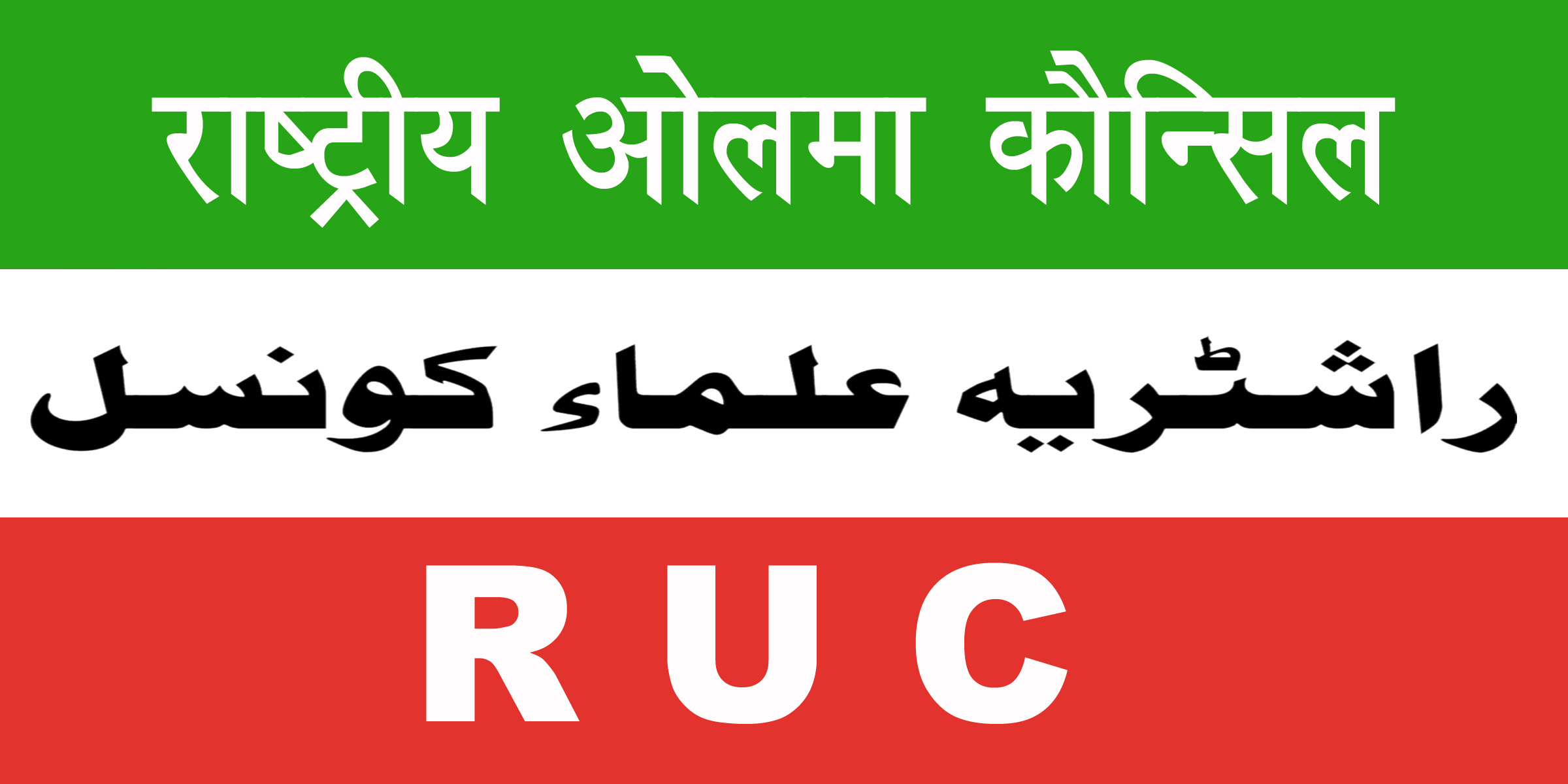

Website
- www.ulamacouncil.org

Rashtriya Ulama Council (RUC) is a political party of India formed in 2008.

== History ==
=== 2009 parliamentary elections ===
RUC participated in the 2009 parliamentary elections on five seats from Uttar Pradesh. As expected, RUC did not win any seats. It did not ally with other parties.

=== 2012 UP Assembly elections ===
RUC participated in the Uttar Pradesh 2012 Assembly election, contesting 100 seats out of 401. As expected, the RUC did not win any seats, but they secured nearly 6 lakh (600,000) votes.

=== 2014 parliamentary elections ===
RUC participated in the 2014 elections on a very few seats, citing the reason that they wanted to stop the fascist forces from coming in to power. The national president of the party Maulana Aamir Rashadi contested election against SP Supremo Mulayam Singh Yadav from Azamgarh, and this created a lot of headlines.

=== 2017 UP Assembly elections ===
RUC had declared 84 candidates, but just one month before the elections, in a shocking turn of events, RUC decided to support BSP to keep away SP and BJP from power and supported the BSP candidates in the elections of the rest of the seats.

=== 2022 UP Assembly elections ===
The Peace Party of India and the Rashtriya Ulama Council (RUC) announced they would contest the 2022 Uttar Pradesh Assembly elections together under the banner of United Democratic Alliance.
