= Tiruchirappalli West Assembly constituency =

One of the 234 State Legislative Assembly Constituencies in Tamil Nadu

Coordinates: 10.812°N 78.653°E

Tiruchirappalli West
- Constituency No. 140 for the Tamil Nadu Legislative Assembly

Constituency details
- Country: India
- Region: South India
- State: Tamil Nadu
- District: Tiruchirappalli
- Lok Sabha constituency: Tiruchirappalli
- Established: 2008
- Total electors: 238,980
- Reservation: None

Member of Legislative Assembly
- 17th Tamil Nadu Legislative Assembly
- Incumbent K. N. Nehru, Deputy Leader of the Opposition in Tamil Nadu Legislative Assembly
- Party: DMK
- Alliance: SPA
- Elected year: 2026

Tiruchirappalli West is one of the 234 state legislative assembly constituencies in Tamil Nadu. It comes under Tiruchirappalli Lok Sabha constituency for Parliament elections and includes Ward Nos. 39-60 of Tiruchirappalli City Municipal Corporation.

== Members of the Legislative Assembly ==
Year	Winner	Party
2011	M. Mariam Pichai	All India Anna Dravida Munnetra Kazhagam
2011^	M. Paranjothi	All India Anna Dravida Munnetra Kazhagam
2016	K. N. Nehru	Dravida Munnetra Kazhagam
2021	K. N. Nehru	Dravida Munnetra Kazhagam
2026	K. N. Nehru	Dravida Munnetra Kazhagam

== Election results ==
Vote share of winning candidates
2026	44.94%
2021	65.27%
2016	51.30%
2011 by-election	54.17%
2011	50.21%

=== 2026 ===
2026 Tamil Nadu Legislative Assembly election: Tiruchirappalli West
Party	Candidate	Votes	%	±%
DMK	K. N. Nehru	88,235	44.94	▼20.33
TVK	G. Ramamoorthi	83,449	42.50	New
AMMK	M. Rajasekharan	14,136	7.20	▲1.94
NTK	K. Bhuvaneswari	7,470	3.80	▼4.89
NOTA	None of the above	1,098	0.56	▼0.61
Margin of victory		4,786	2.44	▼44.59
Turnout		1,96,347	82.16	▲14.93
Registered electors		2,38,980		▼30,214
DMK hold		Swing	▼20.33	

=== 2021 ===
2021 Tamil Nadu Legislative Assembly election: Tiruchirappalli West
Party	Candidate	Votes	%	±%
DMK	K. N. Nehru	118,133	65.27	+13.97
AIADMK	V. Padmanathan	33,024	18.25	−17.22
NTK	V. Vinodh	15,725	8.69	+6.97
MNM	M. Abubacker Siddiq	10,546	5.83	New
SDPI	R. Abdullah Hassan Faizy	2,545	1.41	New
NOTA	NOTA	2,117	1.17	−1.12
Margin of victory		85,109	47.03	31.19
Turnout		1,80,982	67.23	−3.20
Rejected ballots		123	0.07	
Registered electors		2,69,194		
DMK hold		Swing	13.97	

=== 2016 ===
2016 Tamil Nadu Legislative Assembly election: Tiruchirappalli (West)
Party	Candidate	Votes	%	±%
DMK	K. N. Nehru	92,049	51.30	+5.74
AIADMK	R. Manoharan	63,634	35.47	−14.75
DMDK	A. Joseph Jerald	11,469	6.39	New
NOTA	NOTA	4,100	2.29	New
NTK	Sethu. Manoharan	3,080	1.72	New
PMK	K. Vijayaraghavan	1,780	0.99	New
IJK	P. Satheeshkumar	1,012	0.56	New
WPOI	Y. Jamal Mohamed	916	0.51	New
Margin of victory		28,415	15.84	11.18
Turnout		1,79,423	70.43	−4.61
Registered electors		2,54,751		
DMK gain from AIADMK		Swing	1.09	

=== 2011 by-election ===
By-election, 2011: Tiruchirappalli West
Party	Candidate	Votes	%	±%
AIADMK	M. Paranjothi	69,029	54.17	▲3.96
DMK	K. N. Nehru	54,345	42.65	▼2.91
IJK	M. M. Sadiq	906	0.41	▼0.55
UUK	S. Kalasthri	663	0.52	▲0.52
Margin of victory		14,684	11.52	▲6.87
Turnout		1,27,433	61.12	▼13.92
AIADMK hold		Swing	▲3.96	

=== 2011 ===
2011 Tamil Nadu Legislative Assembly election: Tiruchirappalli West
Party	Candidate	Votes	%	±%
AIADMK	M. Mariam Pichai	77,492	50.21	+50.21
DMK	K. N. Nehru	70,313	45.56	+45.56
BJP	R. Thirumal	2,569	1.66	+1.66
IJK	P. Selvam	1,487	0.96	+0.96
Margin of victory		7,179	4.65	
Turnout		1,54,321	75.04	
Registered electors		2,05,662		
AIADMK win (new seat)				
