= Thottiam Assembly constituency =

Former constituency in Tamil Nadu, India

Coordinates: 10°47′15″N 78°46′35″E

Thottiam
- Former constituency for the Tamil Nadu Legislative Assembly

Constituency details
- Country: India
- Region: South India
- State: Tamil Nadu
- District: Trichy
- Lok Sabha constituency: Karur
- Established: 1971
- Abolished: 2008
- Total electors: 165,785 (2006)
- Reservation: None

Thottiam is a state assembly constituency in Tiruchirappalli district in Tamil Nadu.

== Members of the Legislative Assembly ==
Year	Winner	Party
1971	S. K. Vadivelu	Dravida Munnetra Kazhagam
1977	K. P. Kathamuthu	All India Anna Dravida Munnetra Kazhagam
1980	R. Periasami	Indian National Congress (I)
1984	Periyasamy	Indian National Congress
1989	K. Kannaiyan	Dravida Munnetra Kazhagam
1991	N. R. Sivapathi	All India Anna Dravida Munnetra Kazhagam
1996	K. Kannaiyan	Dravida Munnetra Kazhagam
2001	P. Annavi	All India Anna Dravida Munnetra Kazhagam
2006	M. Rajasekharan	Indian National Congress

== Election results ==
Vote share of winning candidates
2006	34.84%
2001	49.38%
1996	65.22%
1991	73.51%
1989	32.51%
1984	68.39%
1980	42.89%
1977	31.85%
1971	51.45%

=== 2006 ===
2006 Tamil Nadu Legislative Assembly election: Thottiam
Party	Candidate	Votes	%	±%
INC	M. Rajasekharan	43,080	34.84%	
MDMK	Natarajan R.	43,027	34.80%	33.38%
Independent	K. Kannaiyan	17,166	13.88%	
DMDK	Manoharan P.	12,445	10.07%	
Independent	Baskar V. P.	1,790	1.45%	
BJP	Natesan N.	1,709	1.38%	
BSP	Saraswathi G	1,635	1.32%	
Independent	Senthilkumar P.	1,425	1.15%	
Independent	Usha C	719	0.58%	
Independent	Krishnan R	646	0.52%	
Margin of victory		53	0.04%	−11.26%
Turnout		1,23,642	74.58%	7.93%
Registered electors		1,65,785		
INC gain from AIADMK		Swing	-14.54%	

=== 2001 ===
2001 Tamil Nadu Legislative Assembly election: Thottiam
Party	Candidate	Votes	%	±%
AIADMK	P. Annavi	57,449	49.38%	19.85%
DMK	K. Kannaiyan	44,301	38.08%	−27.14%
Independent	Pitchai. T.	4,656	4.00%	
Thaayaga Makkal Katchi	Thiagarajan. N.	3,379	2.90%	
Independent	Periasamy . K. R.	2,478	2.13%	
Independent	Devadass . V.	1,741	1.50%	
MDMK	Gopalakrishnan. N.	1,646	1.41%	−2.39%
JP	Senthilvel Durai. P	392	0.34%	
Independent	Kandasamy . P.	295	0.25%	
Margin of victory		13,148	11.30%	−24.38%
Turnout		1,16,337	66.65%	−6.66%
Registered electors		1,74,589		
AIADMK gain from DMK		Swing	-15.84%	

=== 1996 ===
1996 Tamil Nadu Legislative Assembly election: Thottiam
Party	Candidate	Votes	%	±%
DMK	K. Kannaiyan	74,903	65.22%	40.41%
AIADMK	N. Nedumaran	33,921	29.54%	−43.97%
MDMK	E. P. Rathinam	4,367	3.80%	
Independent	C. Guhanathan	475	0.41%	
JP	P. Srinivasan	352	0.31%	
Independent	S. Manoharan	340	0.30%	
Independent	T. Sivalingam	135	0.12%	
Independent	T. Haribaskar	117	0.10%	
Independent	K. Vigneeswaran	115	0.10%	
Independent	M. P. Thangarasu	89	0.08%	
Independent	T. Subramanian	32	0.03%	
Margin of victory		40,982	35.68%	−13.01%
Turnout		1,14,846	73.31%	4.04%
Registered electors		1,65,008		
DMK gain from AIADMK		Swing	-8.29%	

=== 1991 ===
1991 Tamil Nadu Legislative Assembly election: Thottiam
Party	Candidate	Votes	%	±%
AIADMK	N. R. Sivapathi	79,594	73.51%	42.06%
DMK	K. Kannaiyan	26,868	24.81%	−7.69%
PMK	Ramachandran K.	868	0.80%	
THMM	Govindasamy K. P.	513	0.47%	
Independent	Manoharan A.	238	0.22%	
Independent	Maruthamuthu N.	197	0.18%	
Margin of victory		52,726	48.70%	47.64%
Turnout		1,08,278	69.26%	−6.81%
Registered electors		1,59,843		
AIADMK gain from DMK		Swing	41.00%	

=== 1989 ===
1989 Tamil Nadu Legislative Assembly election: Thottiam
Party	Candidate	Votes	%	±%
DMK	K. Kannaiyan	34,994	32.51%	4.98%
AIADMK	Kathamuthu. K. P.	33,857	31.45%	
INC	Periyasamy. R.	24,464	22.73%	−45.66%
AIADMK	Rathinavelu. S.	9,778	9.08%	
Independent	Jayaraj. M. K.	3,416	3.17%	
Independent	Karuppaiah. P.	580	0.54%	
Independent	Karuppaiah. A.	231	0.21%	
Independent	Elangovan. R.	184	0.17%	
Independent	Rajendran. M.	144	0.13%	
Margin of victory		1,137	1.06%	−39.81%
Turnout		1,07,648	76.07%	−3.31%
Registered electors		1,44,492		
DMK gain from INC		Swing	-35.88%	

=== 1984 ===
1984 Tamil Nadu Legislative Assembly election: Thottiam
Party	Candidate	Votes	%	±%
INC	Periyasamy	66,131	68.39%	25.50%
DMK	Vadivel S. R.	26,615	27.52%	
Independent	Thangavel. R.	2,210	2.29%	
Independent	Palaniyandi. P.	664	0.69%	
Independent	Velusamy. K.	440	0.46%	
Independent	Veeramani. A. P.	421	0.44%	
Independent	Ramamoorthy A. P.	219	0.23%	
Margin of victory		39,516	40.86%	40.51%
Turnout		96,700	79.39%	6.68%
Registered electors		1,27,712		
INC hold		Swing	25.50%	

=== 1980 ===
1980 Tamil Nadu Legislative Assembly election: Thottiam
Party	Candidate	Votes	%	±%
INC	Periasami. R.	37,426	42.89%	12.27%
Independent	Jayaraj. T. P. K.	37,119	42.53%	
Independent	Shanmugasundaram. K. M.	11,497	13.17%	
Independent	Musiri Masilamani	524	0.60%	
Independent	Onthachi Pillai. P.	427	0.49%	
Independent	Kannaiyan. V. K.	275	0.32%	
Margin of victory		307	0.35%	−0.88%
Turnout		87,268	72.71%	2.94%
Registered electors		1,21,278		
INC gain from AIADMK		Swing	11.04%	

=== 1977 ===
1977 Tamil Nadu Legislative Assembly election: Thottiam
Party	Candidate	Votes	%	±%
AIADMK	K.P. Kathamuthu	25,638	31.85%	
INC	K.M. Shanmugasundaram	24,648	30.62%	−17.93%
DMK	S.K. Vadivelu	16,648	20.68%	−30.77%
JP	S.P.Ragendran	11,049	13.72%	
Independent	M. Arumugam	2,046	2.54%	
Independent	V. Eluvada	479	0.59%	
Margin of victory		990	1.23%	−1.67%
Turnout		80,508	69.77%	−7.82%
Registered electors		1,17,119		
AIADMK gain from DMK		Swing	-19.60%	

=== 1971 ===
1971 Tamil Nadu Legislative Assembly election: Thottiam
Party	Candidate	Votes	%	±%
DMK	S. K. Vadivelu	39,821	49.68%	
INC	K. M. Shanmughasundaram	37,577	48.55%	
Margin of victory		2,244	2.90%	
Turnout		80,152	77.59%	
Registered electors		1,03,305		
DMK win (new seat)				
