= Perambalur Lok Sabha constituency =

Parliamentary constituency in Tamil Nadu, India

Coordinates: 11.23°N 78.88°E

Perambalur
- Lok Sabha constituency
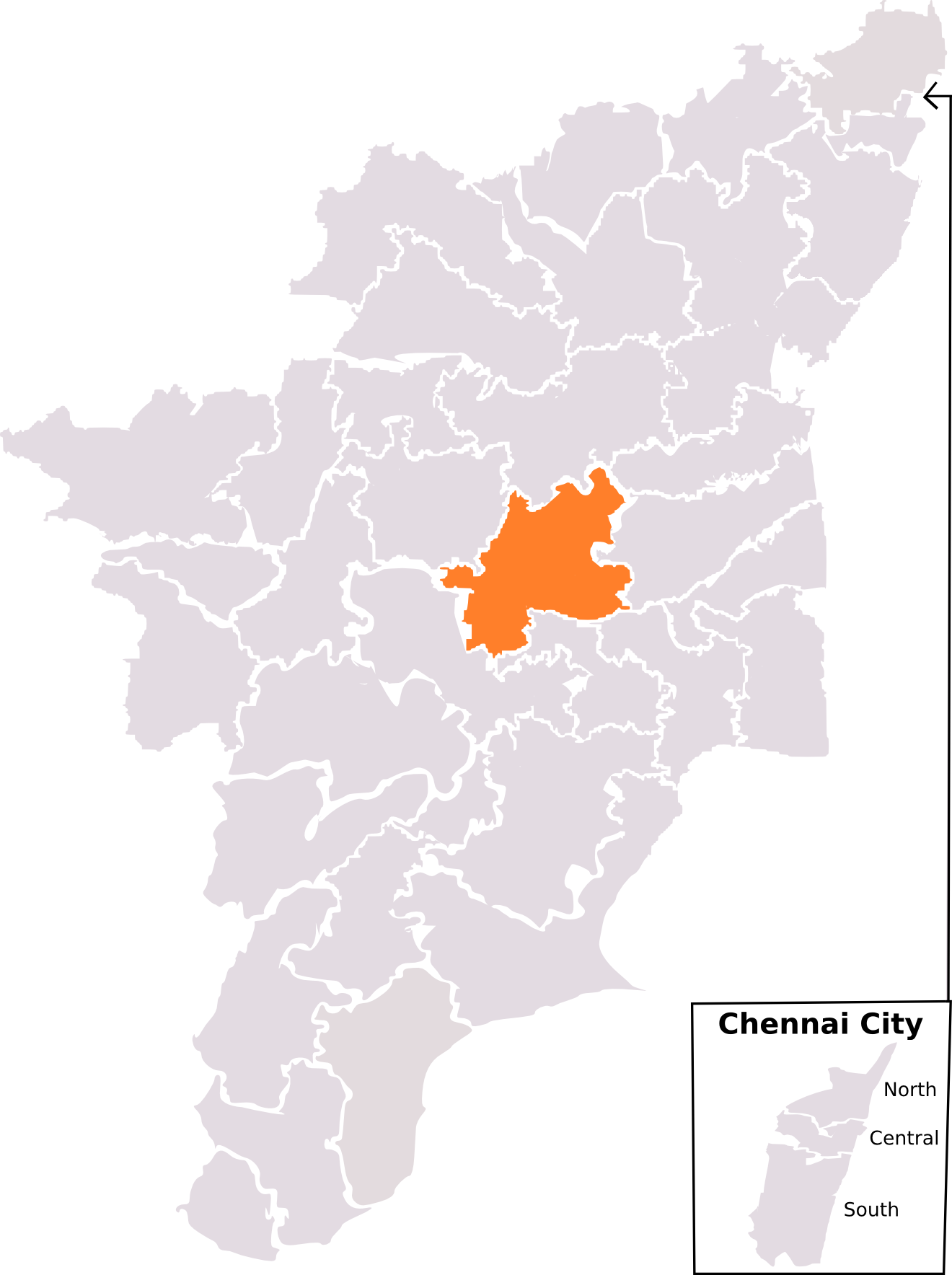
- Perambalur constituency, post-2008 delimitation

Constituency details
- Country: India
- Region: South India
- State: Tamil Nadu
- Assembly constituencies: Kulithalai; Lalgudi; Manachanallur; Musiri; Thuraiyur; Perambalur
- Established: 1952
- Total electors: 13,91,011

Member of Parliament
- 18th Lok Sabha
- Incumbent Arun Nehru
- Party: DMK
- Alliance: None
- Elected year: 2024

Perambalur is a Lok Sabha constituency in Tamil Nadu. Its Tamil Nadu Parliamentary Constituency number is 25 of 39.

== Assembly segments ==
=== 2009–present ===
Perambalur Lok Sabha constituency is composed of the following assembly segments:

Constituency number	Name	Reserved for (SC/ST/None)	District	Party	2024 Lead
137.	Kulithalai	None	Karur	DMK	DMK
143.	Lalgudi	None	Tiruchirappalli	AIADMK	DMK
144.	Manachanallur	None	Tiruchirappalli	DMK	DMK
145.	Musiri	None	Tiruchirappalli	TVK	DMK
146.	Thuraiyur	SC	Tiruchirappalli	TVK	DMK
147.	Perambalur	SC	Perambalur	TVK	DMK

=== Before 2009 ===
Perambalur Lok Sabha constituency is composed of the following assembly segments:

1. Uppiliapuram (ST) (defunct)
2. Perambalur (SC)
3. Varahur (SC) (defunct)
4. Ariyalur (moved to Chidambaram)
5. Andimadam (defunct)
6. Jayankondam (moved to Chidambaram)

== Members of Parliament ==
Year	Winner	Party
1951	V. Boorarangaswami Padayatchi	Tamil Nadu Toilers' Party
1957	M. Palaniyandi	Indian National Congress
1962	Era Seziyan	Dravida Munnetra Kazhagam
1967	A. Durairasu	Dravida Munnetra Kazhagam
1971	A. Durairasu	Dravida Munnetra Kazhagam
1977	A. Asokraj	All India Anna Dravida Munnetra Kazhagam
1980	K. B. S. Mani	Indian National Congress
1984	S. Thanga Raju	All India Anna Dravida Munnetra Kazhagam
1989	A. Asokraj	All India Anna Dravida Munnetra Kazhagam
1991	A. Asokraj	All India Anna Dravida Munnetra Kazhagam
1996	A. Raja	Dravida Munnetra Kazhagam
1998	P. Raja rethinam	All India Anna Dravida Munnetra Kazhagam
1999	A. Raja	Dravida Munnetra Kazhagam
2004	A. Raja	Dravida Munnetra Kazhagam
2009	D. Napoleon	Dravida Munnetra Kazhagam
2014	R. P. Marutharajaa	All India Anna Dravida Munnetra Kazhagam
2019	T. R. Paarivendhar	Indhiya Jananayaga Katchi
2024	Arun Nehru	Dravida Munnetra Kazhagam

== Election results ==
Vote share of Winning candidates
2024	53.42%
2019	62.45%
2014	45.40%
2009	48.08%
2004	55.12%
1999	48.58%
1998	53.37%
1996	59.19%
1991	58.92%
1989	53.41%
1984	63.57%
1980	58.89%
1977	68.62%
1971	56.75%
1967	53.97%
1962	55.90%
1957	48.75%
1951	37.34%

=== General Elections 2024 ===
2024 Indian general election: Perambalur
Party	Candidate	Votes	%	±%
DMK	Arun Nehru	603,209	53.42	▼9.02
AIADMK	N. D. Chandramohan	214,102	18.96	▼6.63
IJK	T. R. Paarivendhar	161,866	14.33	
NOTA	None of the above	10,322	0.91	▼0.08
Margin of victory		389,107	34.46	−
Turnout		1,129,226		
Registered electors				
DMK hold		Swing		

=== General Elections 2019 ===
2019 Indian general election: Perambalur
Party	Candidate	Votes	%	±%
IJK	Dr. T. R. Paarivendhar (Note: IJK contested one seat in DMK's Rising Sun party symbol, therefore he will be considered as DMK party candidates officially by ECI affidavit)	683,697	62.45	37.96
AIADMK	N. R. Sivapathy	2,80,179	25.59	−19.80
Independent	M. Rajasekharan	45,591	4.16	
NOTA	None of the above	11,325	1.03	−0.10
Margin of victory		4,03,518	36.86	15.96
Turnout		10,94,754	79.26	−0.63
Registered electors		13,91,853		8.27
IJK gain from AIADMK		Swing	17.06	

=== General Elections 2014 ===
2014 Indian general election: Perambalur
Party	Candidate	Votes	%	±%
AIADMK	R. P. Marutharajaa	462,693	45.40	6.68
DMK	S. Seemanur Prabu	2,49,645	24.49	−23.58
BJP	T. R. Paarivendhar	2,38,887	23.44	
INC	M. Rajasekharan	31,998	3.14	
NOTA	None of the above	11,605	1.14	
TNMK	K. Ramar Yadav	6,324	0.62	
Margin of victory		2,13,048	20.90	11.55
Turnout		10,19,221	80.25	0.22
Registered electors		12,85,576		22.55
AIADMK gain from DMK		Swing	-2.68	

=== General Elections 2009 ===
2009 Indian general election: Perambalur
Party	Candidate	Votes	%	±%
DMK	D. Napoleon	398,742	48.08	−7.04
AIADMK	K. K. Balasubramanian	3,21,138	38.72	5.29
DMDK	Kamaraj Durai	74,317	8.96	
BSP	G. Selvaraj	5,014	0.60	
Margin of victory		77,604	9.36	−12.33
Turnout		8,29,410	79.33	8.33
Registered electors		10,49,033		4.95
DMK hold		Swing	-7.04	

=== General Elections 2004 ===
2004 Indian general election: Perambalur
Party	Candidate	Votes	%	±%
DMK	A. Raja	389,708	55.12	6.53
AIADMK	Dr. M. Sundaram	2,36,375	33.43	−5.15
JD(U)	V. Ganesan	47,041	6.65	
Independent	K. Jaisankar	15,935	2.25	
JP	Dr. M. Thatchanamoorthy	7,470	1.06	
Independent	A. Jayaraman	6,995	0.99	
Independent	N. Subramanian	3,504	0.50	
Margin of victory		1,53,333	21.69	11.69
Turnout		7,07,028	70.63	5.34
Registered electors		9,99,508		−6.09
DMK hold		Swing	6.53	

=== General Elections 1999 ===
1999 Indian general election: Perambalur
Party	Candidate	Votes	%	±%
DMK	A. Raja	330,675	48.58	−10.60
AIADMK	P. Raja Rethinam	2,62,624	38.59	
TMC(M)	D. Periyasamy	85,209	12.52	
Margin of victory		68,051	10.00	0.54
Turnout		6,80,615	65.40	−8.10
Registered electors		10,64,321		3.82
DMK gain from AIADMK		Swing	-10.60	

=== General Elections 1998 ===
1998 Indian general election: Perambalur
Party	Candidate	Votes	%	±%
AIADMK	P. Raja Rethinam	341,118	53.37	
DMK	A. Raja	2,80,682	43.91	
INC	P. V. Subramanian	16,579	2.59	
Margin of victory		60,436	9.45	−22.32
Turnout		6,39,200	64.56	−8.94
Registered electors		10,25,125		4.39
AIADMK gain from DMK		Swing	-5.82	

=== General Elections 1996 ===
1996 Indian general election: Perambalur
Party	Candidate	Votes	%	±%
DMK	A. Raja	399,079	59.19	30.86
INC	P. V. Subramanian	1,84,832	27.41	
MDMK	S. Durairajan	53,782	7.98	
BJP	R. Moorthy	7,778	1.15	
Independent	R. Pitchaimuthu	5,278	0.78	
Independent	M. Ganapathi	4,475	0.66	
Independent	P. Dhanasekaran	4,323	0.64	
Independent	K. Singaram	3,858	0.57	
Independent	K. Kannapiran	3,464	0.51	
Independent	P. Kalyanasundaram	3,181	0.47	
Margin of victory		2,14,247	31.77	1.18
Turnout		6,74,280	73.50	2.81
Registered electors		9,81,968		5.12
DMK gain from AIADMK		Swing	0.27	

=== General Elections 1991 ===
1991 Indian general election: Perambalur
Party	Candidate	Votes	%	±%
AIADMK	A. Asokraj	375,430	58.92	5.50
DMK	S. V. Ramaswamy	1,80,480	28.32	−4.75
PMK	J. Sivagnanamani	77,831	12.21	
Independent	K. Singaram	3,463	0.54	
Margin of victory		1,94,950	30.59	10.25
Turnout		6,37,204	70.69	−1.56
Registered electors		9,34,168		−0.79
AIADMK hold		Swing	5.50	

=== General Elections 1989 ===
1989 Indian general election: Perambalur
Party	Candidate	Votes	%	±%
AIADMK	A. Asokraj	357,565	53.41	−10.16
DMK	S. Panovai Karuthazhan	2,21,389	33.07	−2.79
PMK	B. John Pandian	83,933	12.54	
Independent	S. Kandasamy	3,127	0.47	
Margin of victory		1,36,176	20.34	−7.36
Turnout		6,69,413	72.25	−4.79
Registered electors		9,41,568		26.86
AIADMK hold		Swing	-10.16	

=== General Elections 1984 ===
1984 Indian general election: Perambalur
Party	Candidate	Votes	%	±%
AIADMK	S. Thangaraju	350,549	63.57	25.34
DMK	C. Thiyagarajan	1,97,780	35.87	
Independent	Sathiya Devaraj	3,103	0.56	
Margin of victory		1,52,769	27.70	7.05
Turnout		5,51,432	77.04	6.42
Registered electors		7,42,190		6.93
AIADMK gain from INC(I)		Swing	4.68	

=== General Elections 1980 ===
1980 Indian general election: Perambalur
Party	Candidate	Votes	%	±%
INC(I)	K. B. S. Mani	282,767	58.89	
AIADMK	S. Thangaraju	1,83,595	38.24	−30.39
Independent	K. Kumaravel	4,812	1.00	
Independent	M. Ayya Kannu	4,012	0.84	
Independent	K. Karmeham	3,504	0.73	
Margin of victory		99,172	20.65	−17.24
Turnout		4,80,175	70.61	−1.69
Registered electors		6,94,116		3.28
INC(I) gain from AIADMK		Swing	-9.73	

=== General Elections 1977 ===
1977 Indian general election: Perambalur
Party	Candidate	Votes	%	±%
AIADMK	A. Asokraj	326,046	68.62	
DMK	J. S. Raju	1,46,019	30.73	−26.02
Independent	M. Mahalingam	3,072	0.65	
Margin of victory		1,80,027	37.89	24.38
Turnout		4,75,137	72.31	−7.00
Registered electors		6,72,075		13.74
AIADMK gain from DMK		Swing	11.87	

=== General Elections 1971 ===
1971 Indian general election: Perambalur
Party	Candidate	Votes	%	±%
DMK	A. Durairasu	258,724	56.75	2.78
INC(O)	M. Ayya Kannu	1,97,155	43.25	
Margin of victory		61,569	13.51	5.57
Turnout		4,55,879	79.31	−2.37
Registered electors		5,90,866		9.86
DMK hold		Swing	2.78	

=== General Elections 1967 ===
1967 Indian general election: Perambalur
Party	Candidate	Votes	%	±%
DMK	A. Durairasu	229,941	53.97	−1.93
INC	P. K. Ramaswamy	1,96,113	46.03	6.52
Margin of victory		33,828	7.94	−8.45
Turnout		4,26,054	81.69	7.99
Registered electors		5,37,811		13.60
DMK hold		Swing	-1.93	

=== General Elections 1962 ===
1962 Indian general election: Perambalur
Party	Candidate	Votes	%	±%
DMK	Era Sezhiyan	188,926	55.90	
INC	M. Palaniyandi	1,33,536	39.51	−9.24
Independent	R. Danarajau	15,539	4.60	
Margin of victory		55,390	16.39	−11.94
Turnout		3,38,001	73.70	21.55
Registered electors		4,73,412		6.98
DMK gain from INC		Swing	7.15	

=== General Elections 1957 ===
1957 Indian general election: Perambalur
Party	Candidate	Votes	%	±%
INC	M. Palaniyandi	112,497	48.75	19.77
Independent	V. Boovaraghaswamy Padayachi	47,133	20.42	
Independent	Mannar Mannan	43,983	19.06	
Independent	Raja Chidambaram	27,165	11.77	
Margin of victory		65,364	28.32	19.96
Turnout		2,30,778	52.15	−10.73
Registered electors		4,42,543		23.20
INC gain from TTP		Swing	11.41	

=== General Elections 1951 ===
1951–52 Indian general election: Perambalur
Party	Candidate	Votes	%	±%
TTP	V. Boovaraghaswamy Padayachi	84,332	37.34	
INC	R. Krishnaswami Reddiar	65,443	28.98	28.98
Independent	Hajee Abdul Kadir Jamali	39,565	17.52	
Independent	K. Rajachidambara Reddiar	36,518	16.17	
Margin of victory		18,889	8.36	
Turnout		2,25,858	62.87	
Registered electors		3,59,221		0.00
TTP win (new seat)				

== See also ==
- Perambalur
- List of constituencies of the Lok Sabha
