= Srirangam Assembly constituency =

One of the 234 State Legislative Assembly Constituencies in Tamil Nadu, in India

Coordinates: 10.85°N 78.70°E

Srirangam
- Constituency No. 139 for the Tamil Nadu Legislative Assembly

Constituency details
- Country: India
- Region: South India
- State: Tamil Nadu
- District: Tiruchirappalli
- Lok Sabha constituency: Tiruchirappalli
- Established: 1951
- Total electors: 2,87,214
- Reservation: None

Member of Legislative Assembly
- 17th Tamil Nadu Legislative Assembly
- Incumbent Ramesh
- Party: TVK
- Elected year: 2026

Srirangam is a state assembly constituency in Tiruchirappalli district in Tamil Nadu. Its State Assembly Constituency number is 139. It comes under Tiruchirappalli Lok Sabha constituency for Parliament elections. It is one of the oldest assembly segments in Tamil Nadu, being in existence since the 1952 election. It is one of the 234 State Legislative Assembly Constituencies in Tamil Nadu, in India. The Devendrakula Velalar, Mutharaiyar and Brahmin play a major role in Srirangam Assembly constituency, as a majority of voters are from these communities.

== Members of Legislative Assembly ==
Year	Member	Political party
Madras State
1952	Chitrambalam	Communist Party of India
1957	K. Vasudevan	Indian National Congress
1962	N. Subramanian Chettiar	Indian National Congress
1967	S. Ramalingam	Indian National Congress
Tamil Nadu
1971	Jothi Venkatachalam	Indian National Congress (O)
1977	R. Soundararajan	All India Anna Dravida Munnetra Kazhagam
1980	R. Soundararajan	All India Anna Dravida Munnetra Kazhagam
1984	R. Soundararajan	All India Anna Dravida Munnetra Kazhagam
1989	Y. Venkatesa Dikshidar	Janata Party
1991	Ku. Pa. Krishnan	All India Anna Dravida Munnetra Kazhagam
1996	T. P. Mayavan	Dravida Munnetra Kazhagam
2001	K. K. Balasubramanian	All India Anna Dravida Munnetra Kazhagam
2006	M. Paranjothi	All India Anna Dravida Munnetra Kazhagam
2011	J. Jayalalithaa	All India Anna Dravida Munnetra Kazhagam
2015	S. Valarmathi	All India Anna Dravida Munnetra Kazhagam
2016	S. Valarmathi	All India Anna Dravida Munnetra Kazhagam
2021	M. Palaniyandi	Dravida Munnetra Kazhagam
2026	S. Ramesh	Tamilaga Vettri Kazhagam

== Election results ==
Vote share of Winning candidates
2026	40.49%
2021	47.89%
2016	48.09%
2015 by-election	68.53%
2011	58.99%
2006	45.98%
2001	53.07%
1996	55.74%
1991	70.51%
1989	35.00%
1984	56.52%
1980	53.48%
1977	31.31%
1971	51.22%
1967	50.48%
1962	54.76%
1957	48.92%
1952	52.60%

=== 2026 ===
2026 Tamil Nadu Legislative Assembly election: Srirangam
Party	Candidate	Votes	%	±%
TVK	S. Ramesh	103,235	40.49	New
DMK	S. Durairaj	69,645	27.31	▼20.58
AIADMK	R. Manoharan	65,819	25.81	▼13.71
NTK	Dharmaraj M.	11,026	4.32	▼3.21
NOTA	None of the above	929	0.36	▼0.66
Margin of victory		33,590	13.18	▲4.81
Turnout		2,54,985	88.78	▲12.49
Registered electors		2,87,214		
TVK gain from DMK		Swing	▲40.49	

=== 2021 ===
2021 Tamil Nadu Legislative Assembly election: Srirangam
Party	Candidate	Votes	%	±%
DMK	M. Palaniyandi	113,904	47.89	+6.19
AIADMK	Ku. Pa. Krishnan	93,989	39.52	−8.57
NTK	K. Selvarathi	17,911	7.53	+6.16
Independent	Y. Jacob	4,082	1.72	New
AMMK	Sarubala R. Thondaiman	3,487	1.47	New
NOTA	NOTA	2,417	1.02	−0.81
Margin of victory		19,915	8.37	1.98
Turnout		237,823	76.29	−3.25
Rejected ballots		183	0.08	
Registered electors		311,716		
DMK gain from AIADMK		Swing	-0.20	

=== 2016 ===
2016 Tamil Nadu Legislative Assembly election: Srirangam
Party	Candidate	Votes	%	±%
AIADMK	S. Valarmathi	108,400	48.09	−10.9
DMK	M. Palaniyandi	93,991	41.70	+6.15
BJP	A. Rajeshkumar	5,988	2.66	+1.53
CPI	V. Pushpam	5,646	2.51	New
NOTA	NOTA	4,110	1.82	New
NTK	V. Rajamanickam	3,095	1.37	New
PMK	S. Umamaheshwari	1,548	0.69	New
Margin of victory		14,409	6.39	−17.05
Turnout		225,389	79.54	−1.19
Registered electors		283,355		
AIADMK hold		Swing	-20.44	

=== 2015 by-election ===
Due to the conviction and jailing of then Chief Minister and MLA J Jayalalithaa in the Disproportionate assets case against Jayalalithaa in September 2014, the MLA position became vacant. Bye-elections were announced.

Bye-election, 2015: Srirangam
Party	Candidate	Votes	%	±%
AIADMK	S. Valarmathi	1,51,561	68.53	+9.54
DMK	N. Anand	55,045	24.89	−10.66
BJP	M. Subramaniam	5,015	2.27	+1.14
CPI(M)	K. Annadurai	1,552	0.70	+0.70
IND.	K. R. Ramaswamy	1,167	0.53	+0.53
NOTA	None of the Above	1,919	0.87	+0.87
Margin of victory		96,516	43.64	+20.20
Turnout		2,21,173	81.80	+0.58
Registered electors		2,70,377		
AIADMK hold		Swing	+9.54	

=== 2011 ===
2011 Tamil Nadu Legislative Assembly election: Srirangam
Party	Candidate	Votes	%	±%
AIADMK	J. Jayalalithaa	105,328	58.99	+13.01
DMK	N. Anand	63,480	35.55	New
BJP	K. A. S. Arivalagon	2,017	1.13	−1.39
IJK	V. Tamilarasi	1,221	0.68	New
BSP	S. Natarajan	928	0.52	New
Margin of victory		41,848	23.44	17.80
Turnout		178,547	80.73	6.13
Registered electors		221,158		
AIADMK hold		Swing	13.01	

=== 2006 ===
2006 Tamil Nadu Legislative Assembly election: Srirangam
Party	Candidate	Votes	%	±%
AIADMK	M. Paranjothi	89,135	45.98	−7.09
INC	G. Jerome Arokiaraj	78,213	40.35	New
DMDK	A. Ramesh	16,522	8.52	New
BJP	P. Parthiban	4,878	2.52	−41.34
Independent	K. Meiyanathan	1,503	0.78	New
Margin of victory		10,922	5.63	−3.58
Turnout		193,841	74.60	16.73
Registered electors		259,848		
AIADMK hold		Swing	-7.09	

=== 2001 ===
2001 Tamil Nadu Legislative Assembly election: Srirangam
Party	Candidate	Votes	%	±%
AIADMK	K. K. Balasubramanian	72,993	53.07	+20.02
BJP	M. Soundarapandian	60,317	43.86	+41.92
Independent	S. Prasanna Venkatesan	1,694	1.23	New
Independent	J. Paul Felominraj Easu	1,042	0.76	New
Independent	M. Anbuselvan	941	0.68	New
Margin of victory		12,676	9.22	−13.47
Turnout		137,531	57.87	−11.06
Registered electors		237,683		
AIADMK gain from DMK		Swing	-2.67	

=== 1996 ===
1996 Tamil Nadu Legislative Assembly election: Srirangam
Party	Candidate	Votes	%	±%
DMK	T. P. Mayavan	73,371	55.74	New
AIADMK	M. Paranjothi	43,512	33.06	−37.45
MDMK	Perur Dharmalingam	9,971	7.58	New
BJP	K. Mahalingam	2,550	1.94	−0.03
Margin of victory		29,859	22.69	−21.39
Turnout		131,623	68.92	3.94
Registered electors		199,316		
DMK gain from AIADMK		Swing	-14.76	

=== 1991 ===
1991 Tamil Nadu Legislative Assembly election: Srirangam
Party	Candidate	Votes	%	±%
AIADMK	Ku. Pa. Krishnan	82,462	70.51	+42.08
JD	R. Jayabalan	30,918	26.44	New
BJP	K. Seshagiri Rao	2,305	1.97	New
PMK	V. Jayabal	617	0.53	New
Margin of victory		51,544	44.07	37.50
Turnout		116,957	64.98	−9.14
Registered electors		188,175		
AIADMK gain from JP		Swing	35.50	

=== 1989 ===
1989 Tamil Nadu Legislative Assembly election: Srirangam
Party	Candidate	Votes	%	±%
JP	Y. Venkatesa Dikshidar	42,629	35.00	New
AIADMK	Ku. Pa. Krishnan	34,621	28.43	−28.09
INC	M. Rajasekaran	26,169	21.49	New
AIADMK	G. Ramachandran	12,868	10.57	−45.95
Independent	V. T. R. Veerappa Gounder	973	0.80	New
Independent	V. Sadagopan	937	0.77	New
Independent	N. P. Ravishankar	683	0.56	New
Margin of victory		8,008	6.58	−13.07
Turnout		121,783	74.12	−4.13
Registered electors		167,690		
JP gain from AIADMK		Swing	-21.51	

=== 1984 ===
1984 Tamil Nadu Legislative Assembly election: Srirangam
Party	Candidate	Votes	%	±%
AIADMK	R. Soudararajan	58,861	56.52	+3.04
JP	C. Ramasamy Udayar	38,399	36.87	New
Independent	Murugan T. Alias Murugesan	4,226	4.06	New
Independent	P. S. Govindan	1,248	1.20	New
Independent	Hari Rao	751	0.72	New
Independent	K. Pitchaimani	660	0.63	New
Margin of victory		20,462	19.65	12.69
Turnout		104,145	78.25	6.49
Registered electors		139,831		
AIADMK hold		Swing	3.04	

=== 1980 ===
1980 Tamil Nadu Legislative Assembly election: Srirangam
Party	Candidate	Votes	%	±%
AIADMK	R. Soudararajan	49,160	53.48	+22.17
INC	V. Swaminathan	42,761	46.52	+27.92
Margin of victory		6,399	6.96	0.91
Turnout		91,921	71.76	3.77
Registered electors		129,664		
AIADMK hold		Swing	22.17	

=== 1977 ===
1977 Tamil Nadu Legislative Assembly election: Srirangam
Party	Candidate	Votes	%	±%
AIADMK	R. Soudararajan	26,200	31.31	New
DMK	M. Dharamalingam	21,135	25.26	−21.81
JP	C. Ramasamy	19,782	23.64	New
INC	V. K. Ranaganathan	15,562	18.60	−32.63
Independent	K. P. Krishnan	532	0.64	New
Independent	S. Thangayan	464	0.55	New
Margin of victory		5,065	6.05	1.90
Turnout		83,675	68.00	−7.34
Registered electors		124,560		
AIADMK gain from INC		Swing	-19.91	

=== 1971 ===
1971 Tamil Nadu Legislative Assembly election: Srirangam
Party	Candidate	Votes	%	±%
INC	Jothi Venkatachalam	36,172	51.22	+0.74
DMK	R. Kamatchiammal	33,239	47.07	−1.77
Independent	S. Thangaiyan	1,204	1.71	New
Margin of victory		2,933	4.15	2.52
Turnout		70,615	75.33	−2.25
Registered electors		98,039		
INC hold		Swing	0.74	

=== 1967 ===
1967 Madras Legislative Assembly election: Srirangam
Party	Candidate	Votes	%	±%
INC	S. Ramalingam	34,474	50.48	−4.28
DMK	M. Aruna	33,356	48.84	+14.32
Independent	A. Kalimuthu	463	0.68	New
Margin of victory		1,118	1.64	−18.60
Turnout		68,293	77.59	−0.01
Registered electors		92,048		
INC hold		Swing	-4.28	

=== 1962 ===
1962 Madras Legislative Assembly election: Srirangam
Party	Candidate	Votes	%	±%
INC	N. Subramanian Chettiar	39,101	54.76	+5.84
DMK	T. Oraisamy	24,651	34.52	New
SWA	K. Vasudevan	6,788	9.51	New
PSP	P. Angusamy	870	1.22	New
Margin of victory		14,450	20.24	−13.96
Turnout		71,410	77.60	23.88
Registered electors		94,737		
INC hold		Swing	5.84	

=== 1957 ===
1957 Madras Legislative Assembly election: Srirangam
Party	Candidate	Votes	%	±%
INC	K. Vasudevan	22,756	48.92	+12.88
Independent	Chitrambalam	6,847	14.72	New
Independent	M. Narayanasamy	6,221	13.37	New
Independent	P. Kathaperumal	5,842	12.56	New
Independent	P. R. Ramasami	4,854	10.43	New
Margin of victory		15,909	34.20	17.64
Turnout		46,520	53.72	−11.54
Registered electors		86,594		
INC gain from CPI		Swing	-3.69	

=== 1952 ===
1952 Madras Legislative Assembly election: Srirangam
Party	Candidate	Votes	%	±%
CPI	Chitrambalam	25,343	52.60	New
INC	Srinivasan	17,364	36.04	New
Independent	Meneenakshi Sundaram	3,854	8.00	New
Akhil Bharat Hindu Maha Sabha	Mahalingam	882	1.83	New
Independent	Subramanian	442	0.92	New
Independent	Tirulokasitaram	293	0.61	New
Margin of victory		7,979	16.56	
Turnout		48,178	65.26	
Registered electors		73,823		
CPI win (new seat)				
