= Manachanallur Assembly constituency =

One of the 234 State Legislative Assembly Constituencies in Tamil Nadu, in India

Coordinates: 10°54′28″N 78°42′08″E

Manachanallur
- Constituency No. 144 for the Tamil Nadu Legislative Assembly

Constituency details
- Country: India
- Region: South India
- State: Tamil Nadu
- District: Tiruchirappalli
- Lok Sabha constituency: Perambalur
- Established: 2008
- Total electors: 2,09,780
- Reservation: None

Member of Legislative Assembly
- 17th Tamil Nadu Legislative Assembly
- Incumbent Kathiravan.S
- Party: DMK
- Elected year: 2026

Manachanallur is a state assembly constituency in Tamil Nadu, India newly formed after constituency delimitations in 2008. Its State Assembly Constituency number is 144. It is included in Tiruchirappalli Lok Sabha constituency. It is one of the 234 State Legislative Assembly Constituencies in Tamil Nadu, in India.

== Members of Legislative Assembly ==
Year	Winner	Party
2011	T. P. Poonatchi	All India Anna Dravida Munnetra Kazhagam
2016	M. Parameswari	All India Anna Dravida Munnetra Kazhagam
2021	S. Kathiravan	Dravida Munnetra Kazhagam
2026	S. Kathiravan	Dravida Munnetra Kazhagam

== Election results ==
Vote share of winning candidates
2026	38.82%
2021	59.46%
2016	46.17%
2011	53.12%
1952	51.45%

=== 2026 ===
2026 Tamil Nadu Legislative Assembly election: Manachanallur
Party	Candidate	Votes	%	±%
DMK	Kathiravan.S	81,447	38.82	▼20.64
TVK	V. Saravanan	69,083	32.93	New
AIADMK	Bharathan.R.V	46,066	21.96	▼7.03
NTK	Thenmozhi.R	9,289	4.43	▼2.95
NOTA	NOTA	599	0.29	▼0.26
Independent	Ramesh Kumar.G	498	0.24	New
Independent	Nagarajan.V	456	0.22	New
BSP	Balakrishnan (a) Amoor Balu	384	0.18	New
Independent	Radhakrishnan.S	341	0.16	New
Independent	Ramprasad.N	230	0.11	New
PT	Balu.M	186	0.09	New
Independent	Raju.V	153	0.07	New
Samaniya Makkal Nala Katchi	K. Senthilkumar	140	0.07	New
Independent	Karthikeyan.P	132	0.06	New
Independent	Saravanakumar.S	130	0.06	New
Independent	Rajasehar.R	117	0.06	New
Independent	Shanmugam.V.T	113	0.05	New
Independent	Divesh.S	103	0.05	New
Independent	Satheeskumar.K	80	0.04	New
Akila Inthiya Makkal Marumalarchi Kazhakam	Revathi.S	75	0.04	New
TVK	Veeraiya.C	62	0.03	New
Independent	Jayaraman.M	52	0.02	New
Independent	Gopalakrishnan.V	44	0.02	New
Margin of victory		12,364	5.89	▼24.58
Turnout		2,09,780	88.65	▲8.53
Registered electors		2,36,632		▼7,570
DMK hold		Swing	▼20.64	

=== 2021 ===
2021 Tamil Nadu Legislative Assembly election: Manachanallur
Party	Candidate	Votes	%	±%
DMK	S. Kathiravan	116,334	59.46%	+17.47
AIADMK	M. Paranjothi	56,716	28.99%	−17.18
NTK	Dr. V. Krishnasamy	14,443	7.38%	+6.44
MNM	R. Samson	1,996	1.02%	New
AMMK	M. Rajasekharan	1,631	0.83%	New
NOTA	NOTA	1,067	0.55%	−0.72
Margin of victory		59,618	30.47%	26.29%
Turnout		195,652	80.12%	−1.93%
Rejected ballots		141	0.07%	
Registered electors		244,202		
DMK gain from AIADMK		Swing	13.29%	

=== 2016 ===
2016 Tamil Nadu Legislative Assembly election: Manachanallur
Party	Candidate	Votes	%	±%
AIADMK	M. Parameswari	83,083	46.17%	−6.96
DMK	S. Ganesan	75,561	41.99%	+1.13
DMDK	M. Babu	8,193	4.55%	New
BJP	S. Aravind	3,662	2.03%	−0.6
NOTA	NOTA	2,274	1.26%	New
NTK	R. Manikandan	1,704	0.95%	New
PMK	M. Prince	1,212	0.67%	New
BSP	P. Ganesan	899	0.50%	−0.01
Margin of victory		7,522	4.18%	−8.09%
Turnout		179,968	82.05%	−2.01%
Registered electors		219,337		
AIADMK hold		Swing	-6.96%	

=== 2011 ===
2011 Tamil Nadu Legislative Assembly election: Manachanallur
Party	Candidate	Votes	%	±%
AIADMK	T. P. Poonatchi	83,105	53.12%	New
DMK	N. Selvaraj	63,915	40.86%	New
BJP	M. Subramaniam	4,127	2.64%	New
Independent	G. Rethinakumar	1,093	0.70%	New
Puratchi Bharatham	V. Anbalagan	1,010	0.65%	New
BSP	P. Ganesan	791	0.51%	New
Margin of victory		19,190	12.27%	
Turnout		186,109	84.06%	
Registered electors		156,437		
AIADMK win (new seat)				

=== 1952 ===
1952 Madras Legislative Assembly election: Manachanallur
Party	Candidate	Votes	%	±%
INC	Rajagopal	14,367	51.45%	New
Independent	Arunachalam	6,121	21.92%	New
Socialist Party (India)	Balakrishnan	3,949	14.14%	New
Independent	Kodandaraman	3,486	12.48%	New
Margin of victory		8,246	29.53%	
Turnout		27,923	44.62%	
Registered electors		62,574		
INC win (new seat)				
