= A. Raja =

Indian politician (born 1963)

Andimuthu Raja
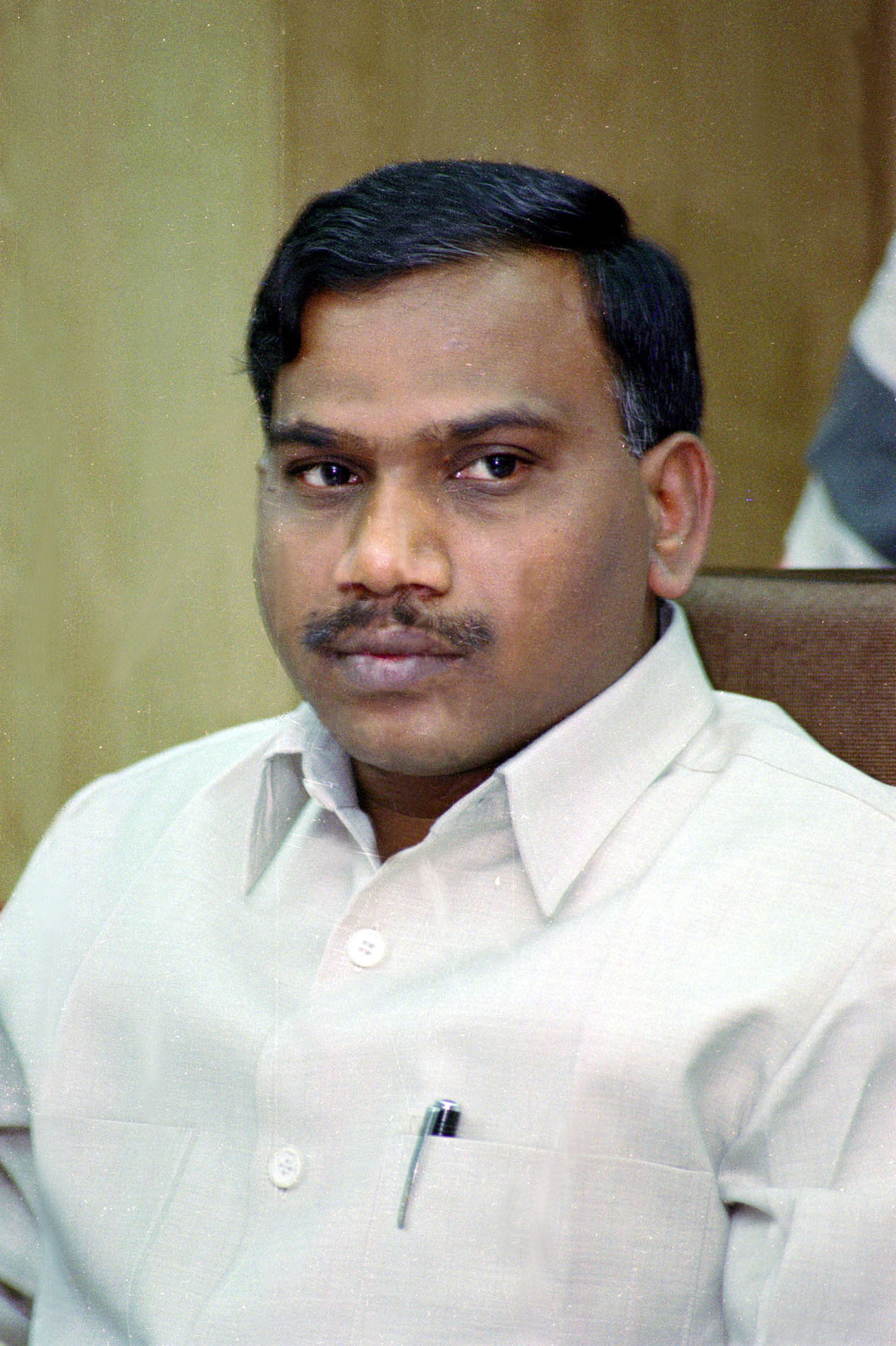
- Raja in 2005

Member of Parliament, Lok Sabha
- Incumbent
- Assumed office 23 May 2019
- Preceded by: C. Gopalakrishnan
- Constituency: Nilgiris, Tamil Nadu
- In office 22 May 2009 – 16 May 2014
- Succeeded by: C. Gopalakrishnan
- Constituency: Nilgiris, Tamil Nadu
- In office 6 October 1999 – 16 May 2009
- Preceded by: P. Raja Rathinam
- Succeeded by: D. Napoleon
- Constituency: Perambalur, Tamil Nadu
- In office 10 May 1996 – 28 February 1998
- Preceded by: A. Asokraj
- Succeeded by: P. Raja Rathinam
- Constituency: Perambalur, Tamil Nadu

Member of Panel of Chairpersons (Lok Sabha)
- Incumbent
- Assumed office 1 July 2024 Serving with Sandhya Ray, Dilip Saikia, Jagdambika Pal, Krishna Prasad Tenneti, Kakoli Ghosh Dastidar, P. C. Mohan, Selja Kumari, Awadhesh Prasad, N. K. Premachandran
- Appointed by: Om Birla

Deputy General Secretary of Dravida Munnetra Kazhagam
- Incumbent
- Assumed office 9 September 2020
- President: M. K. Stalin

Union Minister of Communications and Information Technology
- In office 16 May 2007 – 14 November 2010
- Prime Minister: Manmohan Singh
- Preceded by: Dayanidhi Maran
- Succeeded by: Kapil Sibal

Union Minister of Environment, Forest and Climate Change
- In office 23 May 2004 – 16 May 2007
- Prime Minister: Manmohan Singh
- Preceded by: Ramesh Bais (as MoS I/C)
- Succeeded by: Jairam Ramesh (as MoS I/C)

Union Minister of State for Health and Family Welfare
- In office 30 September 2002 – 21 December 2003
- Prime Minister: Atal Bihari Vajpayee
- Minister: Shatrughan Sinha (2002–03); Sushma Swaraj (2003)

Union Minister of State for Rural Development
- In office 13 October 1999 – 30 September 2002
- Prime Minister: Atal Bihari Vajpayee
- Minister: Sunder Lal Patwa (1999–2000); Venkaiah Naidu (2000–02)

Personal details
- Born: Andimuthu Sathyaseelan; 26 October 1963 (age 62) Andimadam, Madras State, India (present-day Ariyalur, Tamil Nadu)
- Party: Dravida Munnetra Kazhagam
- Spouse: Parameshwari Raja (m. 1996; died 2021)
- Children: Mayuri Raja (daughter)
- Occupation: Politician; attorney

Andimuthu Raja (born Andimuthu Sathyaseelan; 26 October 1963) is an Indian politician from Tamil Nadu, who serves as Member of Parliament for the Nilgiris constituency and the deputy general secretary of Dravida Munnetra Kazhagam. He was a member of the 15th Lok Sabha representing the Nilgiris constituency of Tamil Nadu and had been elected to house four times since 1996. Raja is an advocate by profession and he did his master's degree from Government Law College in Tiruchirappalli.

Raja was first elected to Parliament as a member of Lok Sabha in 1996 from the Perambalur constituency and was reelected from the same constituency in 1999 and 2004 elections and from Nilgiris constituency in 2009. He was Minister of State for Rural development from 1996 to 2000, Minister of State, Health and Family Welfare from September 2000 to May 2004 and a cabinet minister for Environment and Forests from May 2004 to May 2007. He became the cabinet minister for Communication and Information Technology from May 2007, following the resignation of Dayanidhi Maran. Raja was a co-accused in the 2G Spectrum case, along with two other members of the DMK, Dayanidhi Maran and Kanimozhi. All three were acquitted in 2017. Raja was re-elected as Nilgiris MP in the 2019 Lok Sabha elections, and was elected Deputy General Secretary of the DMK in September 2020.

== Early life ==
Raja was born to S. K. Aandimuthu and Chinnapillai Ammal Andimadam of the day Perambalur District of Tamil Nadu. His grandparents, who belong to a Scheduled Caste community, went from Velur in Perambalur district to Sri Lanka to work on the tea estates. They returned to India in the 1950s, and Raja's father returned in 1961.Raja was first introduced to Periyar and Dravidar Kazhagam during his high school days in Perambalur. He quickly became interested in the atheistic, rationalistic Dravidian ideology, along with those of Ambedkar and Marx. He did his B.Sc. in mathematics from the Government Arts College in Musiri. He completed his graduation in law from the Government Law College in Madurai and his masters from Government Law College Tiruchirapalli. He was married to M. A. Parameswari and the couple have a daughter named Mayuri. Parameswari died of cancer on 29 May 2021 aged 57.

== Political career ==
Raja started his political career in his final year as an undergraduate, when he joined DMK students wing and quickly rose through party ranks. When Vaiko was expelled from DMK, Raja was recommended by Rajya Sabha MP S Siva Subramaniam and KN Nehru for the DMK's candidature in Perambalur for 1996 Lok Sabha elections which he won.

== Election results ==
=== General Elections ===
Year	Constituency	Party	Votes	%	Opponent	Opponent Party	Opponent Votes	%	Result	Margin	%
2024	Nilgiris	DMK	473,212	46.44	L. Murugan	BJP	232,627	22.83	Won	240,585	23.61
2019	Nilgiris	DMK	547,832	54.36	M. Thiyagarajan	AIADMK	342,009	33.94	Won	205,823	20.42
2014	Nilgiris	DMK	358,760	40.47	C. Gopalakrishnan	AIADMK	463,007	52.31	Lost	-104,247	-11.84
2009	Nilgiris	DMK	316,802	44.67	C. Krishnan	MDMK	230,781	32.54	Won	86,021	12.13
2004	Perambalur	DMK	389,708	55.12	Dr. M. Sundaram	AIADMK	236,375	33.43	Won	153,333	21.69
1999	Perambalur	DMK	330,675	48.58	P. Raja Rethinam	AIADMK	262,624	38.59	Won	68,051	9.99
1998	Perambalur	DMK	280,682	43.91	P. Raja Rethinam	AIADMK	341,118	53.37	Lost	-60,436	-9.46
1996	Perambalur	DMK	399,079	59.19	P. V. Subramanian	INC	184,832	27.41	Won	214,247	31.78

=== Positions held ===
Date/Period	Position Held
June 2024	Elected to 18th Lok Sabha (6th Term); Member, Joint Committee on the Waqf (Amendment) Bill, 2024 (13 Aug 2024 onwards); Member, Committee on Welfare of Scheduled Castes and Scheduled Tribes (14 Aug 2024 onwards); Member, Committee on Personnel, Public Grievances, Law and Justice (26 Sep 2024 onwards); Member, Committee on Subordinate Legislation (14 May 2025 onwards)
May 2019 - 2024	Re-elected to 17th Lok Sabha (5th term); Chief Whip, DMK Parliamentary Party, Lok Sabha; Member, Business Advisory Committee (25 June 2019 onwards); Member, Panel of Chairpersons, Lok Sabha (26 June 2019 onwards); Member, Committee on Welfare of Scheduled Castes and Scheduled Tribes (24 July 2019 onwards); Member, Standing Committee on Personnel, Public Grievances, Law and Justice (13 Sep 2019 onwards); Member, Committee on Subordinate Legislation (09 Oct 2019 onwards); Member, General Purposes Committee, Lok Sabha (21 Nov 2019 onwards); Member, Consultative Committee, Ministry of Defence
May 2009 - 2014	Re-elected to 15th Lok Sabha (4th Term); Union Cabinet Minister, Communications and Information Technology (31 May 2009 – 14 Nov 2010)
May 2004 - 2009	Re-elected to 14th Lok Sabha (3rd Term); Union Cabinet Minister, Environment & Forests (23 May 2004 – 17 May 2007); Union Cabinet Minister, Communication and Information Technology (18 May 2007)
1999 - 2004	Re-elected to 13th Lok Sabha (2nd Term); Union Minister of State, Rural Development (13 Oct 1999 – 29 Sep 2000); Union Minister of State, Health and Family Welfare (30 Sep 2000 – 21 Dec 2003)
1996 - 1998	Elected to 11th Lok Sabha

== As a minister ==
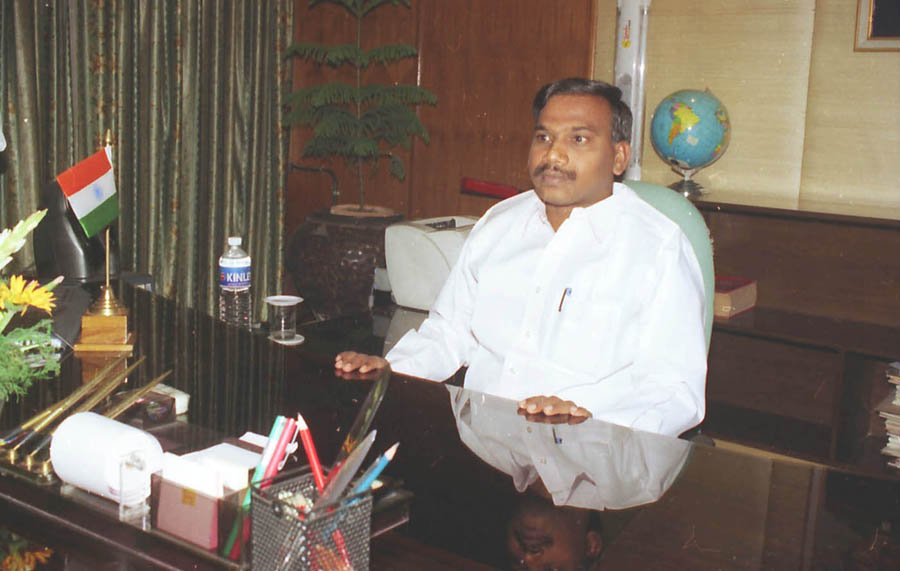
A. Raja assumes the charge of Union Minister of Environment & Forests in New Delhi on 26 May 2004

Raja was deputed as the Minister of State, Rural Development on 13 October 1996 and he continued to retain the post till 29 September 2000. On 30 September 2001, he was deputed as the minister of state for Health and Family welfare during the National Democratic Alliance. In December 2003, the DMK pulled out of the alliance and Raja resigned his minister's post along with his other DMK colleagues. He continued with the same ministry after the 2004 elections which was won by the Congress led alliance, which included the DMK. His tenure as an Environment ministry came under intense scrutiny in 2011 during the 2G Spectrum case. His association with the key accused in the 2G case, Unitech and DB Realty, was rooted to 2004 when he was the Environment minister. One of the key points out of the CBI is the approval of 2016 clearances given by his ministry in a span of two years from 2006 to 2008, some of which were associated with the trading of hazardous waste. The other issue raised was about the large majority of Raja's supporters in the expert appraisals committee (EAC), responsible for granting clearances to various sectors.

In May 2007, Dinakaran, the newspaper run by Kalanidhi Maran, the elder brother of Dayanidhi Maran who was the central minister for IT and Communication, ran into a controversy when it published the results of a series of opinion polls which showed M. K. Stalin, the second son of Karunanidhi, having more approval (70%) than his elder brother M. K. Azhagiri (2%) as the political heir of Karunanidhi. It also showed others as 20%, possibly indicating Dayanidhi Maran and Kanimozhi. The Madurai office of Dinakaran was fire bombed by supporters of Alagiri and three employees were killed. The Sun TV office in Madurai was also attacked by the perpetrators. A day after the incident, Prime Minister Manmohan Singh and Sonia Gandhi came to Chennai for felicitating Karunanidhi for 50 years in legislative assembly. Dayanidhi Maran, who usually accompanies Karunanidhi at every function, discarded the event as a mark of protest. On 13 May, the DMK administrative committee empowered Karunanidhi to remove Dayanidhi from the party. This subsequently led to his resignation from the central ministry. Following his resignation, the IT portfolio was allocated to Raja on 16 May 2007. On 17 October 2008, he submitted his post-dated resignation to the DMK party chief, M. Karunanidhi, in protest of the killings of Tamil civilians in Sri Lanka.

=== 2G spectrum case ===
The 2G spectrum financial scandal involved the alleged corrupt sale in 2008 of telecommunications bandwidth to selected organizations at prices that understated the real market value of the asset. The sale is claimed to have occurred when Raja headed the Telecommunications and IT Ministry; it has been considered the largest political corruption case in modern Indian history, amounting to around ₹1,766.45 billion (US$18 billion) of lost income for the Government of India. It is alleged that the sale should have been put under a transparent auction system.

A first information report filed by the Central Bureau of Investigation (CBI) claims that the allocation was not done as per market prices. The Comptroller and Auditor General (CAG) holds Raja personally responsible for the sale of 2G spectrum at 2001 rates in 2008. In August 2010, evidence was submitted by the CAG showing that Raja had personally signed and approved the majority of the questionable allocations. Although the political opposition was demanding his resignation over the 2G spectrum case, Raja initially refused to resign, stating his innocence, and this view was backed by his party president M. Karunanidhi. He eventually resigned on 14 November 2010.

In 2011, the results of an investigation by retired judge Shivraj Patil, who was appointed by then telecom minister Kapil Sibal, also found Raja to have been directly responsible for "procedural lapses" regarding the sale. The CBI and Enforcement Directorate estimated that Raja could have made as much as Rs 30 billion from the alleged bribes.

In January and February 2011, Raja's houses and offices were raided by the CBI, who seized computers as potential evidence. On 2 February 2011, the CBI arrested Raja with his aide, R. K. Chandolia, and Siddharth Behura, the former telecom secretary and placed them in Tihar jail. Raja and R.K. Chandolia are heard in conversation with Niira Radia in the released Radia tapes.

Subsequent to his arrest, the DMK supported him on the basis that he was innocent until proven guilty.

On 6 June 2012, Delhi court permitted Raja to visit Tamil Nadu between 8 and 30 June, on grounds of discharging his previous duties in the state.

On 15 May 2012, he was granted bail by the Supreme court under a condition that he would not visit the Department of Telecommunications nor his home state Tamil Nadu. He stayed in Tihar jail for fifteen months. The Enforcement Directorate grilled Raja on 10 July 2012 for four hours, to ascertain his role in grant of 2G licenses especially to Swan Telecom and Unitech Wireless.

Delhi court on 21 December 2017 acquitted all accused, including former Telecom Minister A. Raja and DMK Rajya Sabha member Kanimozhi in the 2G spectrum allocation case.

=== Involvement in real estate ===
Sadiq Batcha, a close friend of Raja's, shifted his base to Chennai from his hometown of Perambalur, after Raja became a central minister in 2004. He started a real estate firm called Green House Promoters, which had Raja's nephew Paramesh Kumar as joint managing director and Raja's brother A Kaliyaperumal and Raja's wife Parameswari as directors. Parameswari resigned from the post on account of investigations. Batcha started another real estate firm in 2008 called Equals Estates Pvt Ltd, which had Parameswari as a director. The firm had a turnover of 755 crores in two years, mainly attributed to the association of Raja. Batcha was put under the CBI scanner during the 2G spectrum case as they believed him to be the conduit for Raja. On 16 March 2011, Batcha was found dead in his Chennai residence. Police found a suicide note that read the reason as the excessive media coverage that maligned his image. Police registered a case under suspicious circumstances under Section 174 of the IPC.

== Controversies ==
=== Separate nation for Tamil Nadu ===
On 3 July 2022, A Raja said that the Union government is not giving the state autonomy and the Prime Minister and the Home Minister should not force them into demanding a "thani nadu" (separate nation) while speaking at a meeting held for DMK local body representatives, in the presence of Chief Minister M K Stalin.

"Prime Minister Narendra Modi says all states are to be seen the same, and Home Minister Amit Shah says if you want unity, learn Hindi. The party's founding father Periyar, until [his] death, demanded a thani nadu. But we (DMK) kept aside that demand for our democracy and national integrity, So, I am saying this with the utmost humility. Our CM is travelling in Anna's C. N. Annadurai path so far, do not push us into following Periyar's path. Do not make us revive our demand for a separate state"

DMK immediately distanced itself from the comments and said that the comments made in support of a separate nation is not the stand of the party.

== Books ==
- Raja, Andimuthu (2018). 2G Saga Unfolds. Har-Anand Publications Pvt Limited. ISBN 978-81-241-1890-0.

== See also ==
- List of scandals in India
- Sadiq Batcha
- Suresh Kalmadi
- Justice A.K. Ganguly

Political offices
Preceded by Dayanidhi Maran	Minister of Communications and Information Technology; 2007–10	Succeeded by Kapil Sibal
