= K. K. Balasubramanian =

Member-Tamil Nadu Legislative Assembly
- In office 2001–2006
- Preceded by: T. P. Mayavan
- Succeeded by: M. Paranjothi
- Constituency: Srirangam

Personal details
- Party: All India Anna Dravida Munnetra Kazhagam
- Profession: Politician

K. K. Balasubramanian is an Indian politician and former member Tamil Nadu Assembly. He served as a former minister of Tamil Nadu and was the AIADMK district secretary for the Tiruchirappalli suburban district. He was elected as a Member of the Tamil Nadu Legislative Assembly from the Srirangam constituency in the 2001 elections, where he ran as a candidate for the All India Anna Dravida Munnetra Kazhagam (AIADMK) party.

== Electoral performance ==
=== 2001 ===
2001 Tamil Nadu Legislative Assembly election: Srirangam
Party	Candidate	Votes	%	±%
AIADMK	K. K. Balasubramanian	72,993	53.07%	+20.02
BJP	M. Soundarapandian	60,317	43.86%	+41.92
Independent	S. Prasanna Venkatesan	1,694	1.23%	New
Independent	J. Paul Felominraj Easu	1,042	0.76%	New
Independent	M. Anbuselvan	941	0.68%	New
Margin of victory		12,676	9.22%	−13.47%
Turnout		137,531	57.87%	−11.06%
Registered electors		237,683		
AIADMK gain from DMK		Swing	-2.67%	
