= Pichai =

Pichai may refer to:

- M. Mariam Pichai, Indian politician, environment minister in Tamil Nadu
- Sundar Pichai, an Indian-American software engineer, chief executive officer at Google Inc.
- Shanmugam Ptcyhay or Pichai, a Malaysian-Indian politician
- Pichai Pituwong, Thai football coach
- Pichai Sayotha, Thai amateur boxer

== See also ==
- Phichai (disambiguation)
