= K. Kannaiyan =

Indian politician

K. Kannaiyan is an Indian politician and was a Member of the Legislative Assembly in the state of Tamil Nadu.

Kannaiyan was elected to the Tamil Nadu legislative assembly as a Dravida Munnetra Kazhagam (DMK) candidate from Thottiam constituency in the 1989 and 1996 elections. He stood again in the election of 2001, when he lost to P. Annavi of the All India Anna Dravida Munnetra Kazhagam (AIADMK). He had also contested and lost the seat in 1991, when he finished second to N. R. Sivapathi of the AIADMK.

Kannaiyan contested the Thottiam seat as an independent in the 2006 elections and was placed third behind candidates from the Indian National Congress (INC) and Marumalarchi Dravida Munnetra Kazhagam. His decision to stand as an independent was driven by local discord that had resulted from an electoral pact involving the DMK, as part of the Democratic Progressive Alliance, which had caused it to cede contesting of the seat to a candidate from the INC. He did a similar thing in the 2011 election from the Musiri constituency, into which much of Thottiam had been moved following boundary changes. He again finished in third place, behind the AIADMK victor and an INC candidate.

Kannaiyan is married to K. Suseela and has a daughter.
