= M. Rajasekharan =

Indian politician

M. Rajsekharan was elected to the Tamil Nadu Legislative Assembly from the Thottiam constituency in the 2006 election. He was a candidate of the Indian National Congress (INC) party. Later he joined in All India Anna Dravida Munnetra Kazhagam. Then in 2017, He joined Amma Makkal Munnetra Kazhagam under leadership of T. T. V. Dinakaran

== Electoral history ==
2019 Indian general election: Perambalur
Party	Candidate	Votes	%	±%
DMK	Dr. T. R. Paarivendhar	683,697	62.45%	37.96%
AIADMK	N. R. Sivapathy	2,80,179	25.59%	−19.80%
NTK	K. Shanthi	53,545	4.89%	
AMMK	M. Rajasekharan	45,591	4.16%	
NOTA	None of the above	11,325	1.03%	−0.10%
Margin of victory		4,03,518	36.86%	15.96%
Turnout		10,94,754	79.26%	−0.63%
Registered electors		13,91,853		8.27%
DMK gain from AIADMK		Swing	17.06%	

2014 Indian general election: Perambalur
Party	Candidate	Votes	%	±%
AIADMK	R. P. Marutharajaa	462,693	45.40%	6.68%
DMK	S. Seemanur Prabu	2,49,645	24.49%	−23.58%
BJP	T. R. Paarivendhar	2,38,887	23.44%	
INC	M. Rajasekharan	31,998	3.14%	
NOTA	None of the above	11,605	1.14%	
TNMK	K. Ramar Yadav	6,324	0.62%	
Margin of victory		2,13,048	20.90%	11.55%
Turnout		10,19,221	80.25%	0.22%
Registered electors		12,85,576		22.55%
AIADMK gain from DMK		Swing	-2.68%	

2011 Tamil Nadu Legislative Assembly election: Musiri
Party	Candidate	Votes	%	±%
AIADMK	N. R. Sivapathi	82,631	54.79%	+13.56
INC	M. Rajasekharan	38,840	25.75%	New
Independent	K. Kannaiyan	19,193	12.73%	New
BJP	S. P. Rajendran	2,743	1.82%	+0.7
Independent	K. Panneerselvam	1,761	1.17%	New
Independent	M. Balakrishnan	1,655	1.10%	New
Independent	P. Tamilselvan	1,350	0.90%	New
Independent	N. M. Neethi Muthu Manal	1,086	0.72%	New
Independent	P. Senthilvel	788	0.52%	New
Margin of victory		43,791	29.04%	21.93%
Turnout		184,922	81.55%	5.85%
Registered electors		150,808		
AIADMK gain from DMK		Swing	6.45%	

2006 Tamil Nadu Legislative Assembly election: Thottiam
Party	Candidate	Votes	%	±%
INC	M. Rajasekharan	43,080	34.84%	
MDMK	Natarajan R.	43,027	34.80%	33.38%
Independent	Kannaiyan K	17,166	13.88%	
DMDK	Manoharan P.	12,445	10.07%	
Independent	Baskar V. P.	1,790	1.45%	
BJP	Natesan N.	1,709	1.38%	
BSP	Saraswathi G	1,635	1.32%	
Independent	Senthilkumar P.	1,425	1.15%	
Independent	Usha C	719	0.58%	
Independent	Krishnan R	646	0.52%	
Margin of victory		53	0.04%	−11.26%
Turnout		1,23,642	74.58%	7.93%
Registered electors		1,65,785		
INC gain from AIADMK		Swing	-14.54%	
