= K. N. Nehru =

Indian politician and Deputy Opposition leaders in Tamil Nadu

10th Deputy Leader of the Opposition in the Tamil Nadu Legislative Assembly
- Incumbent
- Assumed office 10 May 2026
- Leader: Udhayanidhi Stalin
- Preceded by: R. B. Udhayakumar
- Constituency: Tiruchirappalli West

Cabinet Minister Government of Tamil Nadu
- In office 7 May 2021 – 5 May 2026
- Minister: Municipal Administration; Urban Development; Water Supply
- Chief Minister: M. K. Stalin
- Preceded by: S. P. Velumani
- In office 13 May 2006 – 15 May 2011
- Minister: Transport; Nationalized Transport; Motor Vehicles Act
- In office 13 May 1996 – 13 May 2001
- Minister: Food; Public Distribution System; Co-operation
- In office 27 January 1989 – 30 January 1991
- Minister: Electricity; Dairy; Labor Welfare; Press
- Chief Minister: M. Karunanidhi

Member of the Tamil Nadu Legislative Assembly
- Incumbent
- Assumed office 19 May 2016
- Preceded by: R. Viswanathan
- Succeeded by: V. Senthil Balaji
- Constituency: Tiruchirappalli West
- In office 11 May 2006 – 13 May 2011
- Preceded by: E. Madhusudhanan
- Constituency: Tiruchirappalli – II
- In office 10 May 1996 – 14 May 2001
- Preceded by: J. Logambal
- Succeeded by: S. M. Balan
- Constituency: Lalgudi
- In office 6 February 1989 – 30 January 1991
- Preceded by: K. Venkatachalam
- Succeeded by: J. Logambal
- Constituency: Lalgudi

Principal Secretary of Dravida Munnetra Kazhagam
- Incumbent
- Assumed office 27 August 2018
- President: M. K. Stalin
- General Secretary: K. Anbazhagan Durai Murugan
- Preceded by: Durai Murugan

Personal details
- Born: Kanakilliyanallur Narayansamy Nehru; 9 November 1952 (age 73) Kanakilliyanallur, Tiruchirapalli district, Tamil Nadu, India
- Party: Dravida Munnetra Kazhagam
- Spouse: Shantha Nehru
- Children: K. N.Arun Nehru
- Parent: Narayanasamy Reddy (father)
- Occupation: Politician, Farmer

Kanakilliyanallur Narayansamy Nehru (born 9 November 1952) is an Indian politician, Deputy leaders of the opposition in the Tamil Nadu Legislative Assembly and Former Minister for Municipal Administration, Urban and Water Supply. He is the Member of Legislative Assembly (MLA) of the Tiruchirappalli West constituency. He is a former Minister for Transport in the Government of Tamil Nadu. He has been elected to the Tamil Nadu Legislative Assembly on five occasions as a candidate of the Dravida Munnetra Kazhagam (DMK) party. He is presently elevated as Principal Secretary of DMK.

== Personal life ==
K. N. Nehru was born in a Telugu Reddy family in Kanakilliyanallur on 9 November 1952. He completed his school education and now lives in Trichy. His son K. N. Arun Nehru is also actively working in Trichy branch of the DMK. Nehru has three younger brothers, one elder sister, and two younger sisters. He has two daughters and one son.

== Politics ==
Nehru's father, an Indian National Congress member, named his son after Jawaharlal Nehru. Later in the early 1970s, Nehru's family moved to the DMK. He started his political career as Pullambadi union chairman.

In 2021 under his leadership Secular Progressive Alliance won all the 9 seats in Tiruchirappalli district.

Nehru successfully organized many high level party meetings, so the DMK party leader and Tamil Nadu chief Minister M. K. Stalin always praises Nehru as "Maanadu endraal Nehru, Nehru endraal Maanadu".

Nehru has been elected to the Tamil Nadu Legislative Assembly on five occasions, twice from Lalgudi constituency, in the elections of 1989 and 1996 and thrice from 2006, 2016 and 2021 Tiruchirappalli West constituency.

== Minister for Transport ==
Nehru was the Minister for Transport in the DMK government from 2006 to 2011. During this period, the bus fleet was modernised and improvements were made to the frequency of buses, passenger amenities and connections to the new suburban areas of Chennai. More than 10,000 new buses were introduced across the state. Fuel efficiency was given an important thrust and drivers were educated on importance of managing fuel.

== Charges ==
Cases have been filed on Nehru by the All India Anna Dravida Munnetra Kazhagam government but the courts have dismissed them as being vague.

The Madras High Court struck down the controversial land-grabbing cells which were primarily used to torment common people and opposition figures. The court had clearly remarked chance of misuse by officials and ruling government citing broad language used in the act.

== Elections Contested and Results ==
| Elections | Constituency | Result | Vote % | Opposition Candidate | Opposition Party | Opposition vote % |
|---|---|---|---|---|---|---|
| 1989 | Lalgudi | Won | 45.95% | Thirunavukkarasu Sami | ADK (JL) | 26.32% |
| 1991 | Lalgudi | Lost | 43.59% | J. Logambal | INC | 54.88% |
| 1996 | Lalgudi | Won | 68.47% | J. Logambal | INC | 20.03% |
| 2001 | Lalgudi | Lost | 45.81% | S.M. Balan | AIADMK | 47.11% |
| 2006 | Tiruchirappalli – II | Won | 49.37% | M. Mariam Pichai | AIADMK | 38.28% |
| 2011 | Tiruchirappalli West | Lost | 45.56% | M. Mariam Pichai | AIADMK | 50.21% |
| 2011 (By Elect) | Tiruchirappalli West | Lost | 42.64% | M. Paranjothi | AIADMK | 54.16% |
| 2016 | Tiruchirappalli West | Won | 51.30% | R. Manoharan | AIADMK | 35.47% |
| 2021 | Tiruchirappalli West | Won | 67.02% | V. Padmanathan | AIADMK | 32.98% |
