= S. Kathiravan =

Indian politician

Member of the Tamil Nadu Legislative Assembly
- Incumbent
- Assumed office 12 May 2021
- Succeeded by: M. Parameswari
- Constituency: Manachanallur

Personal details
- Born: 12 October 1975 (age 51)
- Party: Dravida Munnetra Kazhagam
- Spouse: Ananthalakshmi Kathiravan
- Parents: A. Srinivasan (father); S. Dhanalakshmi (mother)

Srinivasan Kathiravan (born 12 October 1975) is an Indian politician who is a Member of Legislative Assembly of Tamil Nadu. He was elected from Manachanallur as a Dravida Munnetra Kazhagam candidate in 2021.

== Early life ==
Kathiravan was born to A. Srinivasan and S. Dhanalakshmi on 12 October 1975. He was the last child for his parents. He has 3 elder sisters. He is from reddiar community.

== Personal life ==
His father A. Srinivasan is the founder of Dhanalakshmi Srinivasan Groups. They own medical colleges, hospitals, engineering colleges, schools, sugar mills, chit funds, transports, hotels. He completed his Engineering degree in PSNA College.

He is married to Ananthalakshmi Kathiravan, the couple have 2 children.

== Political career ==
He joined Dravida Munnetra Kazhagam in 2021. Within one month of time he got the ticket from Manachanallur Assembly constituency to contest as a DMK candidate. He defeated the All India Anna Dravida Munnetra Kazhagam candidate ex minister M. Paranjothi with a highest margin of 59,618 votes.

== Elections contested ==
Election	Constituency	Party	Result	Vote %	Runner-up	Runner-up Party	Runner-up vote %	Ref.
2021 Tamil Nadu Legislative Assembly election	Manachanallur	DMK	Won	59.46%	M. Paranjothi	ADMK	28.99%	
