= M. Parameswari =

Member-Tamil Nadu Legislative Assembly
- In office 2016–2021
- Preceded by: T. P. Poonatchi
- Succeeded by: S. Kathiravan
- Constituency: Manachanallur

Personal details
- Born: 1 May 1978 South Thathamangalam
- Party: All India Anna Dravida Munnetra Kazhagam
- Profession: Politician

M. Parameswari is an Indian politician and a former member of the Tamil Nadu Legislative Assembly. Parameswari hails from South Thathamangalam in the Tiruchirappalli district. She has completed higher secondary education at Manachanallur Govt. Hr. Sec. School in the year 1996. Parameswari belongs to the All India Anna Dravida Munnetra Kazhagam (AIADMK) party. She contested and won the election in the Manachanallur Assembly constituency in the year 2016, thus becoming a Member of the Legislative Assembly (MLA).

== Electoral performance ==
=== 2016 ===
2016 Tamil Nadu Legislative Assembly election: Manachanallur
Party	Candidate	Votes	%	±%
AIADMK	M. Parameswari	83,083	46.17%	−6.96
DMK	S. Ganesan	75,561	41.99%	+1.13
DMDK	M. Babu	8,193	4.55%	New
BJP	S. Aravind	3,662	2.03%	−0.6
NOTA	NOTA	2,274	1.26%	New
NTK	R. Manikandan	1,704	0.95%	New
PMK	M. Prince	1,212	0.67%	New
BSP	P. Ganesan	899	0.50%	−0.01
Margin of victory		7,522	4.18%	−8.09%
Turnout		179,968	82.05%	−2.01%
Registered electors		219,337		
AIADMK hold		Swing	-6.96%	
