= S. M. Balan =

- எசு. எம். பாலன்

Member of the Tamil Nadu Legislative Assembly
- In office 2001–2006
- Preceded by: K. N. Nehru
- Succeeded by: A. Soundara Pandian
- Constituency: Lalgudi

Personal details
- Born: 17 July 1956 (age 69) Lalgudi, Tamil Nadu, India
- Party: All India Anna Dravida Munnetra Kazhagam
- Occupation: Farmer
- Profession: Politician

S. M. Balan was an Indian politician and a former Member of the Tamil Nadu Legislative Assembly. He hails from Lalgudi, Tiruchirappalli district. Representing the All India Anna Dravida Munnetra Kazhagam (AIADMK) party, he contested and won the 2001 Tamil Nadu Legislative Assembly election from the Lalgudi Assembly constituency to become a Member of the Legislative Assembly (MLA).

== Electoral Performance ==
=== 2001 ===
2001 Tamil Nadu Legislative Assembly election: Lalgudi
Party	Candidate	Votes	%	±%
AIADMK	S. M. Balan	58,288	47.11%	New
DMK	K. N. Nehru	56,678	45.81%	▼22.66
MDMK	C. Adhanam	4,665	3.77%	▼6.72
Independent	P. Stephen	1,412	1.14%	New
Independent	R. Pappu	946	0.76%	New
Independent	J. Akthar Ali	875	0.71%	New
Independent	K. M. Mohankumar	512	0.41%	New
Independent	S. N. Gunasekaran	343	0.28%	New
Margin of victory		1,610	1.30%	−47.14%
Turnout		123,719	67.15%	−9.70%
Registered electors		184,259		
AIADMK gain from DMK		Swing	-21.36%	
