= Lalgudi Assembly constituency =

One of the 234 State Legislative Assembly Constituencies in Tamil Nadu, in India

Coordinates: 10.87°N 78.83°E

Lalgudi
- Constituency No. 143 for the Tamil Nadu Legislative Assembly

Constituency details
- Country: India
- Region: South India
- State: Tamil Nadu
- District: Tiruchirappalli
- Lok Sabha constituency: Perambalur
- Established: 1951
- Total electors: 2,12,403
- Reservation: None

Member of Legislative Assembly
- 17th Tamil Nadu Legislative Assembly
- Incumbent Leema Rose Martin
- Party: AIADMK
- Alliance: NDA
- Elected year: 2026

Lalgudi is a state assembly constituency in Tiruchirappalli district in Tamil Nadu. Its State Assembly Constituency number is 143. It comes under Perambalur Lok Sabha constituency. Most successful party: DMK (ten times). It is one of the 234 State Legislative Assembly Constituencies in Tamil Nadu, in India.

== Members of Legislative Assembly ==
Year	Member	Political party
Madras State
1952	Rajachidambaram	Independent
1957	S. Lazar	Indian National Congress
1962	Anbil P. Dharmalingam	Dravida Munnetra Kazhagam
1967	D. Natarajan	Dravida Munnetra Kazhagam
Tamil Nadu
1971	V. N. Muthamil Selvan	Dravida Munnetra Kazhagam
1977	K. N. Shanmugam	All India Anna Dravida Munnetra Kazhagam
1980	A. P. Dharmalingam	Dravida Munnetra Kazhagam
1984	K. Venkatachalam	Indian National Congress
1989	K. N. Nehru	Dravida Munnetra Kazhagam
1991	J. Logambal	Indian National Congress
1996	K. N. Nehru	Dravida Munnetra Kazhagam
2001	S. M. Balan	All India Anna Dravida Munnetra Kazhagam
2006	A. Soundara Pandian	Dravida Munnetra Kazhagam
2011	A. Soundara Pandian	Dravida Munnetra Kazhagam
2016	A. Soundara Pandian	Dravida Munnetra Kazhagam
2021	A. Soundara Pandian	Dravida Munnetra Kazhagam
2026	Leema Rose Martin	All India Anna Dravida Munnetra Kazhagam

== Election results ==
Vote share of winning candidates
2026	32.82%
2021	48.93%
2016	46.80%
2011	44.71%
2006	47.62%
2001	47.11%
1996	68.47%
1991	54.88%
1989	45.95%
1984	60.09%
1980	40.90%
1977	36.06%
1971	54.51%
1967	50.63%
1962	51.85%
1957	55.38%
1952	62.21%

=== 2026 ===
2026 Tamil Nadu Legislative Assembly election: Lalgudi
Party	Candidate	Votes	%	±%
AIADMK	Leemarose Martin	60,795	32.82	▼6.34
TVK	Ku Pa Krishnan	58,056	31.35	New
DMK	T. Parivallal	55,565	30.00	▼18.93
NTK	N. Madhan	6,992	3.78	▼5.58
Independent	R. Dineshkumar	403	0.22	New
Samaniya Makkal Nala Katchi	K. Immaculate Mary	399	0.22	▲0.06
NOTA	NOTA	390	0.21	▼0.48
BSP	Pratheeba	348	0.19	New
Independent	R. Ponsilambu	340	0.18	New
Independent	Dhanamoorthy.R	220	0.12	New
All India Puratchi Thalaivar Makkal Munnetra Kazhagam	Josephin	192	0.10	New
Tamilaga Makkal Nala Katchi	E. Yesudoss	183	0.10	New
Independent	V. Muthusamy	170	0.09	New
Independent	Jinnah Jakeer Hussain	139	0.08	New
TVK	P. Saravanan	135	0.07	New
PT	P. Elanchezhiyan	131	0.07	0.00
Independent	K. Senthilkumar	130	0.07	New
Independent	M. Rameshkumar	120	0.06	New
Independent	Mansoor Alikhan	101	0.05	New
Independent	K. Dharmaraj	86	0.05	New
Independent	A. Jegan Salamondoss	72	0.04	New
Independent	A. Amalan Savarimuthu	68	0.04	New
Independent	M. Krishnan	66	0.04	New
Independent	Mohamed Abubakkar Siddiq	60	0.03	New
Independent	R. Tamilarasan	52	0.03	New
Margin of victory		2,739	1.47	▼8.30
Turnout		1,85,213	87.20	▲7.64
Registered electors		2,12,403		▼5,728
AIADMK gain from DMK		Swing	▼6.34	

=== 2021 ===
2021 Tamil Nadu Legislative Assembly election: Lalgudi
Party	Candidate	Votes	%	±%
DMK	A. Soundara Pandian	84,914	48.93	▲2.13
AIADMK	D. R. Dharmaraj	67,965	39.16	▼5.33
NTK	I. Malar Tamil Prabha	16,248	9.36	▲8.45
AMMK	M. Vijayamurthy	2,941	1.69	New
NOTA	Nota	1,200	0.69	▼0.48
Independent	U. Johnson	304	0.18	New
SMKNK	K. Kamaraj	270	0.16	New
Independent	Anbil K Thangamani	247	0.14	New
AMGRDMK	R. Silambarasan	138	0.08	New
PT	P. Nambirajan	124	0.07	New
Independent	K. Dharmaraj	120	0.07	New
Margin of victory		16,949	9.77	7.46
Turnout		173,554	79.56	−2.11
Rejected ballots		169	0.10	
Registered electors		218,131		
DMK hold		Swing	2.13	

=== 2016 ===
2016 Tamil Nadu Legislative Assembly election: Lalgudi
Party	Candidate	Votes	%	±%
DMK	A. Soundara Pandian	77,946	46.80	▲2.09
AIADMK	M. Vijayamurthy	74,109	44.50	New
CPI(M)	M. Jayaseelan	6,784	4.07	New
NOTA	None Of The Above	1,953	1.17	New
NTK	P. Sampath	1,521	0.91	New
IJK	K. Selvakumar	892	0.54	New
Independent	K. Murugavel	766	0.46	New
PMK	R. Umamaheswaran	745	0.45	New
Independent	S. Jayachandran	504	0.30	New
Independent	A. Jeyakumar	381	0.23	New
SS	S. Karthik	294	0.18	New
Margin of victory		3,837	2.30	−2.59
Turnout		166,554	81.68	−1.78
Registered electors		203,917		
DMK hold		Swing	2.09	

=== 2011 ===
2011 Tamil Nadu Legislative Assembly election: Lalgudi
Party	Candidate	Votes	%	±%
DMK	A. Soundara Pandian	65,363	44.71	▼2.91
DMDK	A. D. Sendhureswaran	58,208	39.81	▲36.5
IJK	P. Parkkavan Pachamuthu	14,004	9.58	New
BJP	M. S. Lohithasan	2,413	1.65	▲0.43
Independent	K. Thangamani	1,452	0.99	New
Independent	A. Jeyakumar	1,437	0.98	New
BSP	C. Chinnappan	1,167	0.80	▲0.01
Independent	P. Ravi	583	0.40	New
Independent	K. Murugavel	477	0.33	New
Independent	P. Balasubramanian	472	0.32	New
Independent	S. Ayyasamy	346	0.24	New
Margin of victory		7,155	4.89	2.20
Turnout		175,172	83.46	7.64
Registered electors		146,201		
DMK hold		Swing	-2.91	

=== 2006 ===
2006 Tamil Nadu Legislative Assembly election: Lalgudi
Party	Candidate	Votes	%	±%
DMK	A. Soundara Pandian	62,937	47.62	▲1.81
AIADMK	T. Rajaram	59,380	44.93	▼2.19
DMDK	S. Ramu	4,376	3.31	New
BJP	D. Rajendran	1,607	1.22	New
BSP	A. Ganapathi	1,039	0.79	New
Independent	N. Rajaram	757	0.57	New
Independent	A. Muthusamy	474	0.36	New
SP	P. Duraisamy	447	0.34	New
Independent	U. Krishna Moorthy	375	0.28	New
Independent	M. Nataraj	373	0.28	New
TNJC	P. Bala Subramanian	251	0.19	New
Margin of victory		3,557	2.69	1.39
Turnout		132,167	75.83	8.67
Registered electors		174,305		
DMK gain from AIADMK		Swing	0.51	

=== 2001 ===
2001 Tamil Nadu Legislative Assembly election: Lalgudi
Party	Candidate	Votes	%	±%
AIADMK	S. M. Balan	58,288	47.11	New
DMK	K. N. Nehru	56,678	45.81	▼22.66
MDMK	C. Adhanam	4,665	3.77	▼6.72
Independent	P. Stephen	1,412	1.14	New
Independent	R. Pappu	946	0.76	New
Independent	J. Akthar Ali	875	0.71	New
Independent	K. M. Mohankumar	512	0.41	New
Independent	S. N. Gunasekaran	343	0.28	New
Margin of victory		1,610	1.30	−47.14
Turnout		123,719	67.15	−9.70
Registered electors		184,259		
AIADMK gain from DMK		Swing	-21.36	

=== 1996 ===
1996 Tamil Nadu Legislative Assembly election: Lalgudi
Party	Candidate	Votes	%	±%
DMK	K. N. Nehru	84,113	68.47	▲24.88
INC	J. Logambal	24,609	20.03	▼34.84
MDMK	Pon. Pandian	12,890	10.49	New
Independent	P. Subramanian	267	0.22	New
Independent	R. Sriramulu	219	0.18	New
Independent	P. K. Krishnamoorthi	185	0.15	New
Independent	C. Sreerangammal	167	0.14	New
Independent	N. Mookkan	128	0.10	New
Independent	S. Kandasami	97	0.08	New
Independent	A. Manivannan	92	0.07	New
Independent	Rajappa	73	0.06	New
Margin of victory		59,504	48.44	37.16
Turnout		122,840	76.85	2.61
Registered electors		167,192		
DMK gain from INC		Swing	13.60	

=== 1991 ===
1991 Tamil Nadu Legislative Assembly election: Lalgudi
Party	Candidate	Votes	%	±%
INC	J. Logambal	65,742	54.88	▲36.44
DMK	K. N. Nehru	52,225	43.59	▼2.35
JP	S. Prabakaran	394	0.33	New
Independent	S. Kandasamy	243	0.20	New
PMK	P. Rajendran	239	0.20	New
Independent	E. Krishnamoorthy	215	0.18	New
Independent	S. Alagan	199	0.17	New
Independent	P. Pandian	176	0.15	New
Independent	S. Rathakrishanan	160	0.13	New
Independent	R. Daiusamy	122	0.10	New
Independent	T. Balasubramaniam	83	0.07	New
Margin of victory		13,517	11.28	−8.35
Turnout		119,798	74.24	−6.37
Registered electors		166,783		
INC gain from DMK		Swing	8.93	

=== 1989 ===
1989 Tamil Nadu Legislative Assembly election: Lalgudi
Party	Candidate	Votes	%	±%
DMK	K. N. Nehru	54,275	45.95	New
AIADMK	Thirunavukkarasu Sami	31,087	26.32	New
INC	K. Venkatachalam	21,777	18.44	▼41.65
AIADMK	R. Natarajan	10,585	8.96	New
Independent	A. S. Kumarasamy	401	0.34	New
Margin of victory		23,188	19.63	−4.88
Turnout		118,125	80.61	0.06
Registered electors		149,269		
DMK gain from INC		Swing	-14.14	

=== 1984 ===
1984 Tamil Nadu Legislative Assembly election: Lalgudi
Party	Candidate	Votes	%	±%
INC	K. Venkatachalam	61,590	60.09	New
TNC(K)	A. Swaminkan	36,468	35.58	New
Independent	G. Gandhi	2,345	2.29	New
Independent	S. P. Nagarajan	1,057	1.03	New
Independent	S. Kandasamy	532	0.52	New
Independent	Angarai Govindarajan	508	0.50	New
Margin of victory		25,122	24.51	21.71
Turnout		102,500	80.55	3.10
Registered electors		132,489		
INC gain from DMK		Swing	19.19	

=== 1980 ===
1980 Tamil Nadu Legislative Assembly election: Lalgudi
Party	Candidate	Votes	%	±%
DMK	Anbil P. Dharmalingam	40,899	40.90	▲6.5
Independent	A. Swamickan	38,099	38.10	New
Independent	R. Gangadharan	16,016	16.02	New
Independent	A. K. Perumal	4,981	4.98	New
Margin of victory		2,800	2.80	1.14
Turnout		99,995	77.45	5.14
Registered electors		130,260		
DMK gain from AIADMK		Swing	4.84	

=== 1977 ===
1977 Tamil Nadu Legislative Assembly election: Lalgudi
Party	Candidate	Votes	%	±%
AIADMK	K. N. Shanmugam	33,322	36.06	New
DMK	R. Gangadhran	31,789	34.40	▼20.11
INC	N. S. Abedanandham	14,266	15.44	▼22.86
JP	K. N. Thangavelu	12,230	13.23	New
Independent	S. Kandaswamy	808	0.87	New
Margin of victory		1,533	1.66	−14.56
Turnout		92,415	72.31	−8.38
Registered electors		129,589		
AIADMK gain from DMK		Swing	-18.45	

=== 1971 ===
1971 Tamil Nadu Legislative Assembly election: Lalgudi
Party	Candidate	Votes	%	±%
DMK	V. N. Muthamil Selvan	40,213	54.51	▲3.88
INC	D. Rengasamy Udayar	28,250	38.29	▼8.76
Independent	S. Kandasamy	3,927	5.32	New
Independent	P. V. Chidambaram	1,021	1.38	New
Independent	P. Ravanan	364	0.49	New
Margin of victory		11,963	16.22	12.64
Turnout		73,775	80.70	−3.51
Registered electors		95,464		
DMK hold		Swing	3.88	

=== 1967 ===
1967 Madras Legislative Assembly election: Lalgudi
Party	Candidate	Votes	%	±%
DMK	D. Natarajan	37,352	50.63	▼1.22
INC	D. R. Udaiyar	34,712	47.05	▲4.84
Independent	R. Ramadoss	841	1.14	New
Independent	S. Irudayanesan	568	0.77	New
Independent	S. Ayinraju	303	0.41	New
Margin of victory		2,640	3.58	−6.07
Turnout		73,776	84.21	6.00
Registered electors		90,310		
DMK hold		Swing	-1.22	

=== 1962 ===
1962 Madras Legislative Assembly election: Lalgudi
Party	Candidate	Votes	%	±%
DMK	Anbil P. Dharmalingam	38,951	51.85	New
INC	I. Antoniswamy	31,707	42.21	▼13.17
SWA	S. Thangavel	4,459	5.94	New
Margin of victory		7,244	9.64	−1.12
Turnout		75,117	78.21	17.43
Registered electors		98,811		
DMK gain from INC		Swing	-3.53	

=== 1957 ===
1957 Madras Legislative Assembly election: Lalgudi
Party	Candidate	Votes	%	±%
INC	S. Lazar	30,232	55.38	▲17.59
Independent	Anbil P. Dharmalingam	24,354	44.62	New
Margin of victory		5,878	10.77	−13.65
Turnout		54,586	60.78	−8.52
Registered electors		89,815		
INC gain from Independent		Swing	-6.83	

=== 1952 ===
1952 Madras Legislative Assembly election: Lalgudi
Party	Candidate	Votes	%	±%
Independent	Rajachidambaram	26,009	62.21	New
INC	Varadarajan	15,799	37.79	New
Margin of victory		10,210	24.42	
Turnout		41,808	69.30	
Registered electors		60,333		
Independent win (new seat)				
