= M. Palaniyandi (DMK politician) =

Indian politician

Member of the Tamil Nadu Legislative Assembly
- In office 2 May 2021 – 4 May 2026
- Preceded by: S. Valarmathi
- Succeeded by: S. Ramesh
- Constituency: Srirangam

Personal details
- Party: Dravida Munnetra Kazhagam

M. Palaniyandi is an Indian politician who is a Member of Legislative Assembly of Tamil Nadu. He was elected from Srirangam as a Dravida Munnetra Kazhagam candidate in 2021.

== Elections contested ==
Election	Constituency	Party	Result	Vote %	Runner-up	Runner-up Party	Runner-up vote %	Ref.
2021 Tamil Nadu Legislative Assembly election	Srirangam	DMK	Won	47.89%	Ku. Pa. Krishnan	AIADMK	39.52%	
2016 Tamil Nadu Legislative Assembly election	Srirangam	DMK	Lost	41.70%	S. Valarmathi	AIADMK	48.09%	
