= R. Soundararajan =

Indian politician (1933–2009)

Trichy R. Soundararajan

Tamil Nadu Minister of Health and Nutritious Meals
- In office 1978–1989
- Chief Minister: M. G. Ramachandran

Member of the Tamil Nadu Legislative Council
- In office 1977–1989
- Preceded by: Jothi Venkatachalam
- Succeeded by: Y. Venkatesa Dikshidar
- Constituency: Srirangam

Personal details
- Born: 1 December 1933 India
- Died: 1 May 2009 (aged 75)
- Party: All India Anna Dravida Munnetra Kazhagam

Trichy R. Soundararajan was an Indian politician and actor. He is a member of All India Anna Dravida Munnetra Kazhagam. and Member of the Legislative Assembly of Tamil Nadu. He served as the Minister of Health and Nutritious Meals in the Tamil Nadu government during 1978–1989. He died on 1 May 2009.
