= Kumbakonam Lok Sabha constituency =

Former constituency in Tamil Nadu, India

Coordinates: 10.97°N 79.42°E

Kumbakonam
- Former Lok Sabha constituency

Constituency details
- Country: India
- Region: South India
- State: Tamil Nadu
- Established: 1952
- Abolished: 1971
- Reservation: None

Kumbakonam was a Lok Sabha constituency in Tamil Nadu. It existed from 1951 to 1977.

== Assembly segments ==
Kumbakonam Lok Sabha constituency was previously composed of the following assembly segments:

1. Kumbakonam
2. Thiruvaiyaru
3. Valangaimaan
4. Papanasam
5. Aduthurai
6. Jayankondam

== Members of the Parliament ==
Year	Winning Candidate	Party
1951	C. Ramaswamy Mudaliar	Indian National Congress
1957	C. R. Pattabhiraman	Indian National Congress
1962	C. R. Pattabhiraman	Indian National Congress
1967	Era Seziyan	Dravida Munnetra Kazhagam
1971	Era Seziyan	Dravida Munnetra Kazhagam

== Election results ==
Vote share of winning candidates
1971	53.0%
1967	48.6%
1962	45.8%
1957	58.7%
1952	41.6%

=== General election 1971 ===
Party	Candidate	Votes	%
DMK	Era Chezhiyan	242,547	53.0%
NCO	C.R.Ramasamy	203,794	44.5%
Majority		38,753	8.5%
Turnout		446,341	78.0%
DMK Hold			

=== General election 1967 ===
Party	Candidate	Votes	%
DMK	Era Chezhiyan	213,866	48.6%
INC	C.R.P.Raman	193,827	44.0%
IND	L.Seshsdri	14,952	3.4%
IND	I.Bhaktar	3,443	0.8%
Majority		20,039	4.6%
Turnout		426,088	79.8%
DMK gain from INC			

=== General election 1962 ===
Party	Candidate	Votes	%
INC	C.R.Pattabiraman	155,389	45.8%
DMK	T.K.Sreenivasan	144,490	42.6%
PSP	S.A.Rahim	18,268	5.4%
IND	T.S.Krishnamoorthy	7,820	2.3%
IND	Irusappa Bhaktar	3,187	0.9%
Majority		10,899	3.2%
Turnout		329,154	72.9%
INC Hold			

=== General election 1957 ===
Party	Candidate	Votes	%
INC	C.R.Pattabiraman	127,631	58.7%
PSP	S.A.Rahim	60,309	27.8%
IND	R.M.Shesasdri	29,346	13.5%
Majority		67,322	
Turnout		217,286	50.5%
INC Hold			

=== General election 1952 ===
Party	Candidate	Votes	%
INC	C.Ramasamy Mudhaliar	95,433	41.6%
IND	Ramaih	62,124	27.1%
IND	S.Ramanathan Chettiyar	33,286	14.5%
IND	K.Viswanathan	20,166	8.8%
IND	S.A.Ramaih	10,872	4.7%
IND	N.R.Narayanaswamy	7,576	3.3%
Majority		33,309	14.5%
Turnout		229,457	63.5%
INC Win (New Seat)			

== See also ==
- Kumbakonam
- List of constituencies of the Lok Sabha
