= T. R. Paarivendhar =

Indian politician and academician (born 1941)

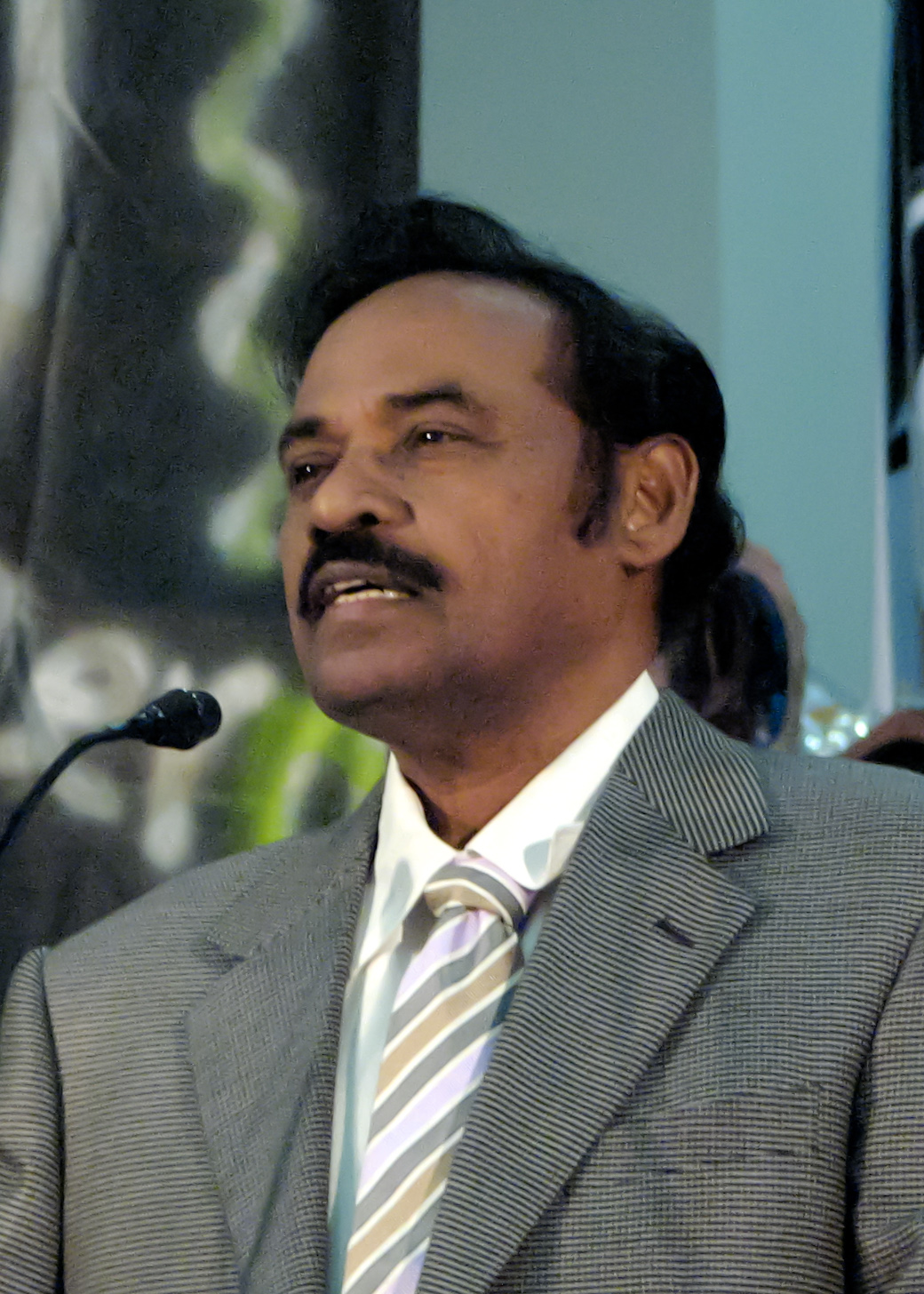
- Pachamuthu during Milan 2009 at SRM University

Member of Parliament, Lok Sabha
- In office 23 May 2019 – 4 June 2024
- Preceded by: R. P. Marutharajaa
- Succeeded by: Arun Nehru
- Constituency: Perambalur

Personal details
- Born: 24 August 1941 (age 85) Thandavarayapuram Village, Attur, Madras Province, British India
- Party: Indhiya Jananayaga Katchi
- Other political affiliations: Dravida Munnetra Kazhagam; Bharatiya Janata Party
- Spouse: Eswari Pachamuthu
- Children: Ravi Pachamuthu, Sathyanarayanan Pachamuthu, Geetha Pachamuthu
- Parent(s): Ramasamy Udayar, Valliammal
- Occupation: Politician, Academician

Thandavarayapuram Ramasamy Paarivendhar, better known as T. R. Paarivendhar (also known as T. R. Pachamuthu, born 24 August 1941) is an Indian politician, academician, founder-president of Indhiya Jananayaga Katchi and Ex MP to the 17th Lok Sabha from Perambalur Lok Sabha constituency, Tamil Nadu.

He is well known as the founder-chairman of the SRM Institute of Science and Technology.

== Political career ==
He contested and won the 2019 Indian general election on DMK's Rising Sun symbol being an Indhiya Jananayaga Katchi party member. His party contested along with the Bharatiya Janata Party in the 2016 Tamil Nadu Legislative Assembly election. In 2019 he walked out of the AIADMK-BJP alliance after the Pattali Makkal Katchi joined it. His party allied with Kamal Hassan's Makkal Needhi Maiam during the 2021 Tamil Nadu Legislative Assembly election.

== Arrest and court case ==
The Chennai Central Crime Branch police arrested SRM University chancellor Pari Vendhar on 26 August 2016, after questioning him overnight. The arrest followed complaints from over 100 students who claimed they paid money for a medical seat at SRM college but didn't get admitted. The Central Crime Branch police found initial evidence suggesting his involvement in cheating students of Rs. 75 crore. The case began when Madhan, a close aide to Pachamuthu and Managing Partner of Vendhar Movies, went missing in May 2016, leaving a suicide note. In the note, Madhan lamented that after collecting crores of rupees from parents, they would be unable to meet their pledge. While Paarivendhar filed a case accusing Madhan of illegally collecting the money, over 110 parents addressed the police, claiming to have donated Rs. 50 lakh each on their assurance of admission to the MBBS course. The Saidapet magistrate court announced his decision to remand him to 15 days in custody the same day.

A case has been filed in Madras High Court on 2016 that Parivendar occupied land worth Rs.371 crores designated for the Adi Dravidas in Kanchipuram district's Kattangolathur for his SRM university. The Madras High Court on 14 July 2016 ordered notices to be sent to Kanchipuram District Collector and Parivendar in this case.

== Electoral performance ==
=== Lok Sabha ===
Year	Constituency	Party	Votes	%	Opponent		Votes	%	Result	Margin
2014	Perambalur	BJP	238,887	23.44	AIADMK	R. P. Marutharajaa	462,693	45.40	Lost	−223,806
2019	Perambalur	DMK	683,697	62.45	AIADMK	N. R. Sivapathy	280,179	25.59	Won	403,518
2024	Perambalur	BJP	161,866	14.33	DMK	Arun Nehru	603,209	53.42	Lost	−441,343
