= Sadiq Batcha =

Indian businessman

Sadiq Batcha (c. 1972 – 16 March 2011) was an Indian entrepreneur and the managing director of real estate company Green House Promoters Private Limited. Sadiq allegedly committed suicide under suspicious circumstances related to the 2G spectrum case in India. Police found a suicide note that read the reason as the excessive media coverage that maligned his image said he felt sorry for A. Raja's plight.

== Early career ==
Batcha was born in kattur village in Lalgudi taluk, Trichy, one of four brothers. Whilst Batcha was still in Karur his two brothers Jamal Mohammed and Jaffar Ali opened a real estate business. Batcha received a Master of Business Administration (MBA). He had a modest start to his career, selling mattresses and clothes as a door-to-door salesperson. He initially went door-to-door by foot, then by bicycle.

Anecdotal accounts of Batcha's early financial ventures claim that he sought to purchase land, providing the owning party with an initial deposit upfront. He would then re-sell the land to a larger party, making a profit, and settle his debt with the initial landowner. Batcha borrowed sums of money from banks and private lenders and began to diversify his activities. Some of these ventures failed and, at this point, Batcha sought the help of a lawyer, A. Raja. Allegations of improper conduct surfaced soon after in relation to Batcha's pre-existing ownership of cheaply acquired land involved with important infrastructure projects that were scheduled for the Perambalur district.

A. Kaliaperumal, A. Raja's elder brother, is the Joint MD (managing director) of Green House Promoters.

== Business Interests ==
Green House Promoters Private Limited was floated months after A. Raja became a Union minister in 1999. The real estate company soon flourished, acquiring huge tracts of land in the state's small towns and selling it at a huge premium. It was alleged that Batcha forcibly acquired large tracts of land from the poor at cheap rates and sold it to Madras Rubber Factory for a huge sum.

The Green House Promoters, starting as a nondescript company with an equity base of Rs 100,000 in 2004, grew to a company of over Rs 6 billion in revenue within a short time. The CBI is investigating the rapid growth of the company.

The company also indirectly benefited from the 2G spectrum case by acquiring shares of a company that, in turn, became a partner in Shahid Balwa's Swan Telecom. Swan Telecom was one of the beneficiaries of the first-come-first-served policy, which came from the then minister for Telecom in India.

== Death ==
Sadiq Batcha is said to have committed suicide at his residence in Chennai on Wednesday, 16 March 2011 (IST). He was found hanged at his home. He was pronounced "dead on arrival" at the Apollo hospital in Chennai at about 1:30 pm. Doctors believe he died of asphyxia. Some believe that this was not a suicide, but that he died from mysterious causes. In a long letter, which started with an apology, he blamed none for his suicide and said he felt sorry for Raja's plight. He expressed his wish to be reborn and wanted his siblings to be happy and his wife and children to stay in Chennai for their education.

Some believe that Batcha had too much information and he was the man who could have given CBI the exact map of the 2G money trail. It is also alleged that he was the link between the 2G money, the underworld and the hawala operators.

A CBI investigation alleged that his company, Greenhouse, was a front company belonging to Raja, and all the money earned through the 2G spectrum case was hidden in Greenhouse. The investigations have also shown that Batcha handled all of Raja's money. The CBI wanted names of four very crucial accomplices who helped Batcha rout the money between India and Singapore. These men are alleged to be operatives of the Dawood gang. Sources say the CBI wanted to interrogate Batcha further on this on the Wednesday he was found dead. The doctor who performed an autopsy and postmortem on Batcha's body resigned from government service. Dr V Dekal, who heads the department of forensic sciences at Madras Medical College, and whose father was a DMK member said he had put in his papers on 3 March, over a fortnight before Batcha's suicide, to contest the Tamil Nadu assembly elections. The Directorate of Public Health has reportedly rejected Dr V Dekal's resignation on grounds of shortage of staff and lack of sufficient notice. Dekal claims that he was only on contract with the Health Department and could, therefore, quit at any time. CBI investigated the case. Professor T D Dogra of AIIMS was consulted by CBI, but in April 2012, Indian media reported that CBI did not find any evidence which could indicate that it was a murder and not a suicide.

The 2G case verdict acquitted all accused. In its ruling in 2017 it cited that "There is no evidence on the record produced before the Court indicating any criminality in the acts allegedly committed by the accused persons."
