= Phichai =

Phichai may refer to:

- Phichai District
- Phichai, Lampang
- Phraya Phichai, historic Thai nobleman in the Ayutthaya period

== See also ==
- Pichai (disambiguation)
