= C. Ramaswamy =

Member of Parliament (Lok Sabha) for Kumbakonam
- In office 1951–1957
- Prime Minister: Jawaharlal Nehru
- Preceded by: none
- Succeeded by: C. R. Pattabhiraman

Personal details
- Born: 1905
- Died: 9 July 1997 (age 92)
- Party: Indian National Congress
- Education: Government College, Kumbakonam
- Profession: lawyer

C. Ramaswamy Mudaliar (1905 – 9 July 1997), also known simply as C. Ramaswamy, was an Indian businessman, politician and Member of Lok Sabha from Kumbakonam. He studied in Government College, Kumbakonam and graduated from Madras Law College.

Ramaswamy served as Vice Chairman of the Kumbakonam Municipal Council from 1939 to 1947. In 1951, he contested in the First Lok Sabha elections as the candidate of the Indian National Congress from Kumbakonam and served as a member of Parliament from 1951 to 1957.
