= M. Palaniyandi =

Indian politician and trade union leader

Maruthaiya Palaniyandi

Member of Parliament (Lok Sabha) for Perambalur
- In office 1957–1962
- Prime Minister: Jawaharlal Nehru
- Preceded by: V. Boorarangasami Padayachi
- Succeeded by: Era Seziyan

Personal details
- Born: 10 December 1918
- Died: 9 March 2005 (aged 86)
- Party: Indian National Congress, Tamil Maanila Congress
- Spouse: Punithavalli
- Profession: Politician

Maruthaiya Palaniyandi (10 December 1918 – 9 March 2005) was an Indian politician and trade union leader from Tamil Nadu. He was a member of the Indian National Congress and later, Tamil Maanila Congress.

== Personal life ==
Palaniyandi was born on 10 December 1918 to Maruthaiya. He married M. Punithavalli. The couple have three sons and a daughter.

== Politics ==
After completing his S. S. L. C., Palaniyandi entered politics and served as a trade union leader. Palaniyandi joined the Indian National Congress and was elected to the Madras Legislative Assembly in 1952 from Lalgudi. He served as an M. L. A. from 1952 to 1957 when he contested the Lok Sabha elections from Perambalur and was elected. Palaniyandi served as a member of the Lok Sabha from 1957 to 1962 when he lost to Era Seziyan of the Dravida Munnetra Kazhagam. Palaniyandi also served as a member of the Rajya Sabha from 1986 to 1992. He was President of the Tamil Nadu Pradesh Congress Committee from 1983 to 1988. Palaniyandi floated the Tamil Maanila Congress in 1996 along with G. K. Moopanar.
