= Arun Nehru (Tamil Nadu politician) =

Indian politician

Member of Parliament, Lok Sabha
- Incumbent
- Assumed office 4 June 2024
- Preceded by: T. R. Paarivendhar
- Constituency: Perambalur

Personal details
- Born: Arun; 12 December 1983 (age 42) Tiruchirappalli, Tamil Nadu India
- Party: Dravida Munnetra Kazhagam
- Parent: K. N. Nehru
- Occupation: Politician

Arun Nehru is an Indian politician and a member of the Lok Sabha from the Perambalur Lok Sabha constituency of Tamil Nadu. He is a member of the Dravida Munnetra Kazhagam.

== Political career ==
In the 2024 general election of India, Arun defeated Chandramohan N D of All India Anna Dravida Munnetra Kazhagam by 389107 votes.

== See also ==
- 2024 Indian general election
- Dravida Munnetra Kazhagam
- Perambalur Lok Sabha constituency
