= A. Durairasu =

Indian politician

A. Durairasu was an Indian politician and former Member of Parliament elected from Tamil Nadu. He was elected to the Lok Sabha from Perambalur constituency as a Dravida Munnetra Kazhagam candidate in 1967 and 1971 elections.
