= A. Soundara Pandian =

Indian politician

A. Soundara Pandian is an Indian politician and incumbent member of the Tamil Nadu Legislative Assembly from the Lalgudi constituency. As a cadre of Dravida Munnetra Kazhagam party, he represented the same Lalgudi constituency in the 2006, 2011, 2016 and 2021 elections.

== 2021 election ==
2021 Tamil Nadu Legislative Assembly election: Lalgudi
Party	Candidate	Votes	%	±%
DMK	A. Soundara Pandian	84,914	48.93%	2.13
AIADMK	D. R. Dharmaraj	67,965	39.16%	-5.33
NTK	I. Malar Tamil Prabha	16,248	9.36%	8.45
AMMK	M. Vijayamurthy	2,941	1.69%	New
NOTA	Nota	1,200	0.69%	0.48
Independent	U. Johnson	304	0.18%	New
SMKNK	K. Kamaraj	270	0.16%	New
Independent	Anbil K Thangamani	247	0.14%	New
AMGRDMK	R. Silambarasan	138	0.08%	New
PT	P. Nambirajan	124	0.07%	New
Independent	K. Dharmaraj	120	0.07%	New
Margin of victory		16,949	9.77%	7.46%
Turnout		173,554	79.56%	-2.11%
Rejected ballots		169	0.10%	
Registered electors		218,131		
DMK hold		Swing	2.13%	

== 2016 election ==
2016 Tamil Nadu Legislative Assembly election: Lalgudi
Party	Candidate	Votes	%	±%
DMK	A. Soundara Pandian	77,946	46.80%	2.09
AIADMK	M. Vijayamurthy	74,109	44.50%	New
CPI(M)	M. Jayaseelan	6,784	4.07%	New
NOTA	None Of The Above	1,953	1.17%	New
NTK	P. Sampath	1,521	0.91%	New
IJK	K. Selvakumar	892	0.54%	New
Independent	K. Murugavel	766	0.46%	New
PMK	R. Umamaheswaran	745	0.45%	New
Independent	S. Jayachandran	504	0.30%	New
Independent	A. Jeyakumar	381	0.23%	New
SHS	S. Karthik	294	0.18%	New
Margin of victory		3,837	2.30%	-2.59%
Turnout		166,554	81.68%	-1.78%
Registered electors		203,917		
DMK hold		Swing	2.09%	

== 2011 election ==
2011 Tamil Nadu Legislative Assembly election : Lalgudi
Party	Candidate	Votes	%	±%
DMK	A. Soundara Pandian	65,363	44.71%	2.91
DMDK	A. D. Sendhureswaran	58,208	39.81%	36.5
IJK	P. Parkkavan Pachamuthu	14,004	9.58%	New
BJP	M. S. Lohithasan	2,413	1.65%	0.43
Independent	K. Thangamani	1,452	0.99%	New
Independent	A. Jeyakumar	1,437	0.98%	New
BSP	C. Chinnappan	1,167	0.80%	0.01
Independent	P. Ravi	583	0.40%	New
Independent	K. Murugavel	477	0.33%	New
Independent	P. Balasubramanian	472	0.32%	New
Independent	S. Ayyasamy	346	0.24%	New
Margin of victory		7,155	4.89%	2.20%
Turnout		175,172	83.46%	7.64%
Registered electors		146,201		
DMK hold		Swing	-2.91%	

== 2006 election ==
2006 Tamil Nadu Legislative Assembly election: Lalgudi
Party	Candidate	Votes	%	±%
DMK	A. Soundara Pandian	62,937	47.62%	1.81
AIADMK	T. Rajaram	59,380	44.93%	2.19
DMDK	S. Ramu	4,376	3.31%	New
BJP	D. Rajendran	1,607	1.22%	New
BSP	A. Ganapathi	1,039	0.79%	New
Independent	N. Rajaram	757	0.57%	New
Independent	A. Muthusamy	474	0.36%	New
SP	P. Duraisamy	447	0.34%	New
Independent	U. Krishna Moorthy	375	0.28%	New
Independent	M. Nataraj	373	0.28%	New
TNJC	P. Bala Subramanian	251	0.19%	New
Margin of victory		3,557	2.69%	1.39%
Turnout		132,167	75.83%	8.67%
Registered electors		174,305		
DMK gain from AIADMK		Swing	0.51%	
