= N. Subramanian Chettiar =

Indian businessman, philanthropist, and politician

Member of the Madras State Assembly
- In office 1962–1967
- Preceded by: T. Oraisamy
- Constituency: Srirangam

Personal details
- Party: Indian National Congress

N. Subramanian Chettiar was an Indian businessman, philanthropist, politician and former Member of the Legislative Assembly of Tamil Nadu. He was elected to the Tamil Nadu legislative assembly as an Indian National Congress candidate from Srirangam constituency in 1962 election.
