= Era Sezhiyan =

Member of parliament of Rajya sabha
- In office 1978–1984

Member of parliament, Lok Sabha for Kumbakonam
- In office 1967–1977
- Prime Minister: Indira Gandhi
- Preceded by: C. R. Pattabhiraman
- Succeeded by: constituency dissolved

Member of parliament, Lok Sabha for Perambalur
- In office 1962–1967
- Prime Minister: Jawaharlal Nehru, Lal Bahadur Shastri, Indira Gandhi
- Preceded by: M. Palaniyandi
- Succeeded by: A. Duraiarasu

Personal details
- Born: 28 April 1923 Thirukannapuram, Tanjore District, Madras Presidency, British India (now in Nagapattinam district , Tamil Nadu, India)
- Died: 6 June 2017 (aged 94) Vellore, Tamil Nadu, India
- Party: Dravida Munnetra Kazhagam 1952-1976 Janata party1977-2001
- Spouse: Dr.Prema
- Profession: Politician

Era Sezhiyan (28 April 1923 – 6 June 2017) or Rajagopal Seziyan was an Indian writer and politician. His original name was R.Srinivasan and changed his name to fall in line with other DMK leaders who opted for Tamil names instead of Sanskritised forms. He was known for having rediscovered and published 'Shah Commission Report' which was reported destroyed by Indira Gandhi Government.

== Personal life ==
Seziyan was born to V. S. Rajagopal on 28 April 1923. He completed his master's before entering politics. He married Dr. Prema Seziyan.

== Public life ==
Seziyan was a well-known writer in Tamil and has written numerous short stories and one-act plays. He joined the Dravida Munnetra Kazhagam at an early age. In 1962, he stood for election from Perambalur Lok Sabha constituency and was elected to the Lok Sabha or lower house of the Indian Parliament. He served as a Member of Parliament for Perambalur from 1962 to 1967. In the 1967 Lok Sabha elections, Sezhiyan defeated two-time Congress MP C. R. Pattabhiraman from Kumbakonam. He was brother of Navalar V.R. Nedunchezian and both of them were founder members of DMK. Later, attracted to Jayaprakash Narayan's ideologies, he joined the Janata Party. He represented the Janata Party in Parliament as a Rajya Sabha member between 1978 and 1984. In 2001, he retired from active politics.

== Editing Shah Commission report ==
The atrocities committed during Emergency 1975 were enquired and published in Shah Commission Report during 1980 but was suppressed by next draconian Government. It was believed that all copies of Shah Commission report were either destroyed or disappeared and after three decades, Era Sezhiyan traced a copy of the report and published with editorial notes during 2010.
