= S. Valarmathi =

Indian politician

Minister of Backward Classes, Most Backward Classes and Denotified Communities
- In office 23 May 2016 – 3 May 2021
- Chief Minister: J.Jayalalithaa; O. Panneerselvam; Edappadi K. Palaniswami
- Preceded by: S. Abdul Rahim
- Succeeded by: S. S. Sivasankar
- Constituency: Srirangam

Member of Tamil Nadu Legislative Assembly
- In office 17 February 2015 – 3 May 2021
- Preceded by: J.Jayalalithaa
- Succeeded by: M. Palaniyandi
- Constituency: Srirangam

Personal details
- Born: Keezhkutapatti, Kulithalai, Tiruchirapalli, Tamil Nadu, India
- Party: Tamilaga Vettri Kazhagam
- Other political affiliations: All India Anna Dravida Munnetra Kazhagam
- Children: 2
- Education: M.A., B.L., B.Ed., Ph.D.,
- Profession: Lawyer, Politician

S. Valarmathi is an Indian politician and Former member of Tamil Nadu Legislative Assembly from Srirangam constituency in Tamil Nadu.

She belongs to Muthuraja community. Jayalalithaa appointed Valarmathi as Minister for Backward Classes and Minority Welfare in May 2016. This was her first cabinet post in the Government of Tamil Nadu.

== Posts held ==
#	From	To	Position
1	Oct 2011	Jan 2015	Member, Tiruchirappalli City Municipal Corporation
2	Feb 2015	May 2016	Member, 15th Fourteenth Assembly of Tamil Nadu
3	May 2016	May 2021	Minister of Overseas Indian Affairs, Government of Tamil Nadu
