= P. Annavi =

Indian politician

P. Annavi is an Indian politician and was a Member of the Legislative Assembly (MLA) in the state of Tamil Nadu.

Annavi was elected to the Tamil Nadu legislative assembly as an All India Anna Dravida Munnetra Kazhagam (AIADMK) candidate from Thottiam constituency in the 2001 state assembly election. In the Jayalalithaa-led AIADMK government that resulted from those elections, he was Minister for Backwards Classes from June 2003, then Minister for Agriculture and then, from 2004, Minister for Labour Welfare. He was not nominated by the AIADMK to stand in the 2006 elections.
