= T. P. Mayavan =

Indian politician

T. P. Mayavan is an Indian politician and was a Member of the Legislative Assembly of Tamil Nadu. He was elected to the Tamil Nadu Legislative Assembly as a Dravida Munnetra Kazhagam (DMK) candidate from Srirangam constituency in the 1996 election.
