= A. Asokraj =

Indian politician

A. Asokaraj was an Indian politician and former Member of Parliament elected from Tamil Nadu. He was elected to the Lok Sabha from Perambalur constituency as an Anna Dravida Munnetra Kazhagam candidate in 1977, 1989 and 1991 elections.
