= Periyasamy =

Periyasamy is a common Indian name. It may refer to

== Politicians ==
- N. Periasamy, former Tuticorin MLA
- N. K. K. Periasamy, former Erode MLA
- V. Periasamy, former Anthiyur MLA
- M. P. Periaswami, former Namakkal MLA
- I. Periyasamy, Tamil Nadu minister for Revenue and Housing.
