= Ku. Pa. Krishnan =

Indian politician

- கு. ப. கிருஷ்ணன்

Chairman, Tamil Nadu Urban Habitat Development Board
- Incumbent
- Assumed office 2026
- Preceded by: Established

Minister for Agriculture, Government of Tamil Nadu
- In office 1991–1996

Member of the Tamil Nadu Legislative Assembly
- In office 2011–2016
- Constituency: Alangudi

Personal details
- Born: Kuzhumani Paramasivam Krishnan
- Party: Tamilaga Vetri Kazhagam
- Other political affiliations: All India Anna Dravida Munnetra Kazhagam (AIADMK)
- Spouse: Malliga
- Occupation: Politician

Ku. Pa. Krishnan Full Name Kuzhumani Paramasivam Krishnan is an Indian politician and agriculture minister of Tamil Nadu from 1991 to 1996. He was a member of the Tamil Nadu Legislative Assembly from the Alangudi constituency between 2011 and 2016. He currently represents the Tamilaga Vettri Kazhagam party.

Ku. Pa. Krishnan (Kuzhumani Paramasivam Krishnan) is an Indian politician from the state of Tamil Nadu. He served as the Minister for Agriculture in the Government of Tamil Nadu from 1991 to 1996. He later served as a Member of the Tamil Nadu Legislative Assembly representing the Alangudi constituency from 2011 to 2016.

== Political career ==
Krishnan was a senior leader of the All India Anna Dravida Munnetra Kazhagam (AIADMK) and held several organizational and administrative positions within the party. During the government headed by J. Jayalalithaa, he served as the Minister for Agriculture.

He was elected to the Tamil Nadu Legislative Assembly from the Alangudi constituency and served from 2011 to 2016.

He contested the April 2026 Tamil Nadu Assembly Election as a TVK candidate from the Lalgudi constituency in Tiruchirappalli but was unsuccessful. Ku. Pa. Krishnan lost to Leema Rose Martin by a narrow margin of 2,739 votes.

== Tamilaga Vettri Kazhagam ==
In 2026, Krishnan joined the Tamilaga Vettri Kazhagam (TVK), the political party founded by actor and politician Vijay. Following the 2026 Tamil Nadu Assembly election, he was appointed Chairman of the Tamil Nadu Urban Habitat Development Board.

== Personal life ==
Krishnan is known for his long involvement in Tamil Nadu politics and public administration. He has been associated with agricultural development, rural welfare, and regional political organization.

== See also ==
- Tamilaga Vetri Kazhagam
- Vijay
- M. G. Ramachandran
- J. Jayalalithaa
- M. Karunanidhi
- All India Anna Dravida Munnetra Kazhagam
- Dravida Munnetra Kazhagam
- Tamilar Boomi
- Tamil Nadu Legislative Assembly
