= R. P. Marutharajaa =

Indian politician

- மருதராஜா

Member of the India Parliament for Perambalur
- In office 1 September 2014 – 23 May 2019
- Constituency: Perambalur

Personal details
- Born: 7 March 1963 (age 63) Renganatha puram, Perambalur, Tamil Nadu
- Party: All India Anna Dravida Munnetra Kazhagam
- Spouse: Smt. Kalaiselvi
- Children: 2
- Education: National College, Tiruchirappalli
- Occupation: Agriculturist, Politician
- As of 17 December, 2016

R P Marutharajaa (born 1963) is an Indian politician and Member of Parliament elected from Tamil Nadu. He is elected to the Lok Sabha from Perambalur constituency. He contested as an Anna Dravida Munnetra Kazhagam candidate in 2014 election. He had served as chairman of Perambalur union between 2011 and 2014.
