= M. Mariam Pichai =

Indian politician

M. Mariam Pichai was the environment minister in Tamil Nadu. He was appointed as minister following his victory in 2011 Legislative Assembly election. He died in a car accident on 23 May 2011 on his way to Chennai to participate in the oath-swearing ceremony for the newly elected Assembly.
