= Indiya Jananayaka Katchi =

- Leader: T. R. Paarivendhar
- Founder: T. R. Paarivendhar
- Headquarters: No. 9, 3rd Avenue, 3rd Street, Ashok Nagar, Chennai-600083, Tamil Nadu, India
- Alliance: NDA (2011-2019) (2024-present); AIADMK+ (2025-present); UPA (2019-2021); MNM (2021); SPA (2019-2021)
- Seats in Rajya Sabha: 0 / 245
- Seats in Lok Sabha: 0 / 543
- Seats in Tamil Nadu Legislative Assembly: 0 / 234
- Number of states and union territories in government: 0 / 31

Party flag
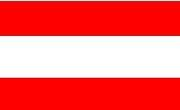

Indiya Jananayaka Katchi (transl. Indian Democratic Party; abbr. IJK) is a political party in Tamil Nadu, India. It was founded by T. R. Paarivendhar, an academic and the founder of SRM Group of institutions. The party is based in Chennai. IJK contested the 2014 General Elections through an alliance with the BJP-led NDA. IJK contested the 2016 Tamil Nadu Assembly Elections also through an alliance with the BJP-led NDA but could not register a single victory. IJK contested the 2019 General Elections through an alliance with the DMK-led UPA. T. R. Paarivendhar contested in Perambalur and won with a margin of 4,03,518 votes.

== See also ==
- List of political parties in India
