= N. R. Sivapathi =

Indian politician

N. R. Sivapathi is an Indian politician and incumbent member of the Tamil Nadu legislative assembly from Musiri constituency.

Sivapathi was sacked as Minister for Animal Husbandry in November 2011 as part of the third cabinet reshuffle in a five-month period by Chief Minister Jayalalithaa. He is said to be the state youthwing secretary of his party AIADMK for which he had contested and won. He was appointed for the post for his efficient handling skills.

Following the 2026 Tamil Nadu Legislative Assembly election, N. R. Sivapathi has joined TVK in June 2026.
