= M. Paranjothi =

Indian politician

M. Paranjothi is an Indian politician and was a member of the Tamil Nadu legislative assembly from Tiruchirappalli West constituency. As a cadre of All India Anna Dravida Munnetra Kazhagam, he was previously elected to Srirangam constituency in 2006 elections.

Paranjothi won a by-election in the Tiruchirappalli West constituency in 2011 and in November of that year a cabinet reshuffle by Jayalalithaa resulted in him replacing both S. P. Shanmuganathan as Minister for Hindu Religious and Charitable Endowments and G. Senthamizhan as Minister for Information, Law and Courts.
