= February 1910 =

Month of 1910

<<	February 1910					>>
Su	Mo	Tu	We	Th	Fr	Sa
		1	2	3	4	5
6	7	8	9	10	11	12
13	14	15	16	17	18	19
20	21	22	23	24	25	26
27	28

The following events occurred in February 1910:

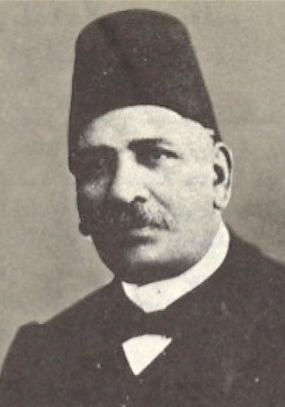
February 20, 1910: Egyptian Premier Boutros Ghali assassinated

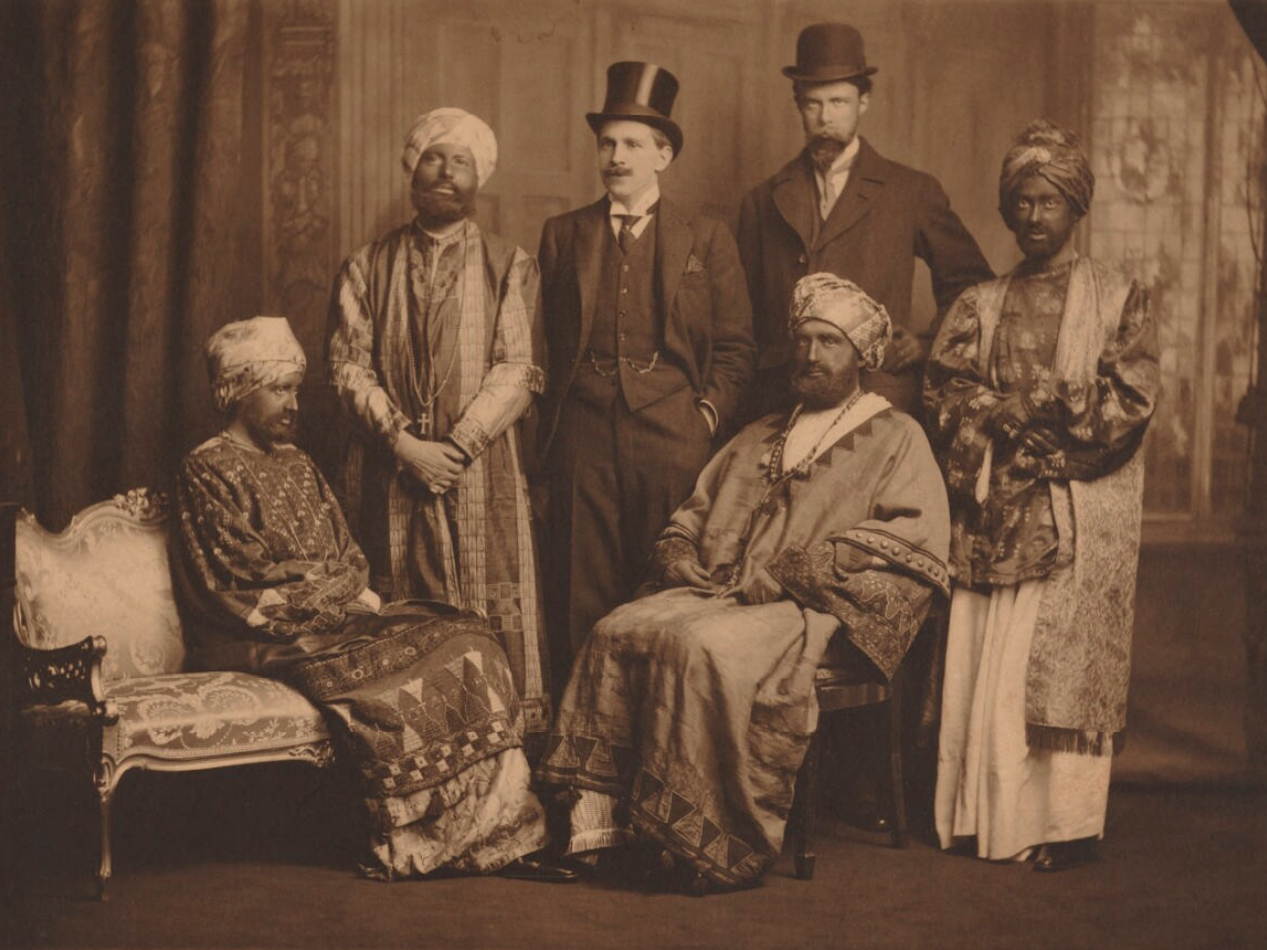
February 10, 1910: HMS Dreadnought victim of hoaxters

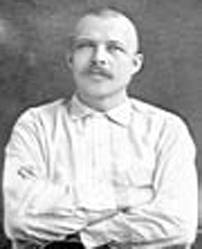
February 2, 1910: Serial killer Billy Gohl is finally stopped

== February 1, 1910 (Tuesday) ==
- Wollert Konow became the new Prime Minister of Norway, taking over from Gunnar Knudsen.
- Elections for the House of Commons of the United Kingdom were completed, with the Liberal Party having 274 seats, and the Unionists having 272. Prime Minister Asquith retained power, with the Liberals forming a coalition with the Irish nationalists.
- Thirty-four coal miners were killed in an explosion of the Browder Coal Company in Drakesboro, Kentucky. The blast was believed to have been caused by a repairman entering a section with an uncovered lamp.
- August Euler became the first person to obtain a pilot's license from Germany.

== February 2, 1910 (Wednesday) ==
- Billy Gohl, the "Ghoul of Gray's Harbour", was arrested in Aberdeen, Washington, for the murder of his former henchman Charley Hatberg, bringing his string of killings to an end. Gohl, a local leader in the Sailors' Union of the Pacific, was suspected in the murders of as many as 124 people whose bodies were found, and of others who had disappeared. Since Washington had recently abolished its death penalty, Gohl spent the rest of his life in prison, dying in 1927.
- In the third mine disaster in as many days, sixty-eight miners were killed at the Palau coal mine at Las Esperanzas, in the State of Coahuila in Mexico. Initial reports blamed the explosion on someone lighting a cigarette inside the mine.

== February 3, 1910 (Thursday) ==
- Greytown, Nicaragua's Caribbean port, was bombarded for twenty minutes by the gunboat Ometepe, commandeered by rebel forces at war with the government of José Madriz. One hundred people died in the day's fighting, and nine buildings in Greytown were destroyed, but the Ometepe was driven off by the town's batteries.
- The first pyloromyotomy, a surgery to correct the congenital narrowing (in infants) of the path between the stomach and the intestines (pyloric stenosis) was performed in Edinburgh by Sir Harold Stiles. However, the procedure is named for Dr. Wilhelm Ramstedt, who did the surgery seven months later on July 28, 1911.
- The village of Strome, Alberta was incorporated.
- Born: Robert Earl Jones, African-American actor; in Senatobia, Mississippi (d. 2006)

== February 4, 1910 (Friday) ==
- The steamship Kentucky began sinking off the coast of Cape Hatteras at 6:00 in the morning. Wireless operator W.D Maginnis, continuously transmitted an S.O.S. and the coordinates: "We are sinking our latitude is 32°10' longitude 76°30' Kentucky". At 11:30 a.m., E.D. Seaman, the operator on the steamship Alamo, picked up the signal 65 miles away. After more than four hours travel at full speed, the Alamo sighted the Kentucky, whose hold was, by then, more than half full of water. All forty-seven men on board were saved by lifeboats, which the sailors of the Alamo sent out in stormy waters.
- Died: William C. Lovering, 75, Massachusetts U.S. Congressman since 1897, died of pneumonia.

== February 5, 1910 (Saturday) ==
- Eleven men, all but one of them Hungarian, were killed at the Jefferson Clearfield Coal Company mine at Ernest, Pennsylvania, but another 110 were able to escape.
- Dillon County, South Carolina was created.
- Born: Francisco Varallo, Argentina national football team member and last living footballer from the first World Cup; in La Plata (d. 2010)

== February 6, 1910 (Sunday) ==
- The U.S. Navy tugboat USS Nina departed Norfolk, Virginia, bound for Boston, and disappeared along with her crew of 31. She was last sighted off the Capes of the Chesapeake in the midst of a gale and would be declared lost on March 15.
- The residents of Argentina saw airplanes for the first time. Several aviators from France appeared at a show held as part of the South American nation's centennial year celebrations.
- Born: Carlos Marcello, American Mafia boss; in Tunis, French North Africa (d. 1993)
- Died: Alfonso Maria Fusco, 70, Italian priest and founder of the Baptistine Sisters ministry to the poor

== February 7, 1910 (Monday) ==
- France became the latest nation to join the naval arms race, as its cabinet approved the bill for the largest expansion of the French Navy. The $28,000,000 plan called for construction of 28 battleships, 52 torpedo boats, 94 submarines, and 22 other boats over a ten-year period.
- Edmond Rostand's allegorical play Chantecler was presented for the first time, with Lucien Guitry in the title role as a rooster, and other actors portraying farm animals. The play opened at the Théâtre de la Porte Saint-Martin in Paris, and a translated version appeared on Broadway in 1911, with Maude Adams in the title role.
- Born: Jack Lovelock, New Zealand athlete, gold medalist in 1,500 m at 1936 Olympics; in Crushington (killed by train, 1949)

== February 8, 1910 (Tuesday) ==
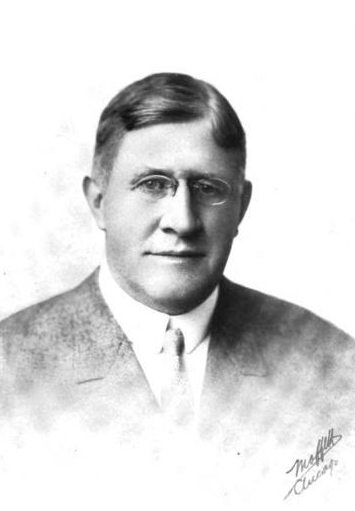
William D. Boyce circa 1912

- The Boy Scouts of America was founded, after Chicago publisher William D. Boyce observed the Boy Scouts during a visit to Great Britain. Boyce incorporated the BSA in the District of Columbia. Boyce, and with the help of attorney James West, then set about merging other scout groups into the organization, which received a charter by act of Congress in 1916.
- The town of Dyer, Indiana, was incorporated.

== February 9, 1910 (Wednesday) ==
- The French liner General Chanzy sank in the Mediterranean, after striking rocks near the Spanish island of Menorca. There was only one survivor of the 157 men, women and children on board.
- Born:
  - Jacques Monod, French biochemist who won the Nobel Prize in Physiology or Medicine in 1965; in Paris (d. 1976)
  - Anna Sokolow, American choreographer; in New York City (d. 2000)

== February 10, 1910 (Thursday) ==
- In what became known as the "Dreadnought hoax", Prince Makalin of Abyssinia and five other members of royalty were welcomed aboard the British battleship HMS Dreadnought following the receipt of a telegram from the office of the Undersecretary of Foreign Affairs, Charles Hardinge. The prince turned out to be prankster Horace de Vere Cole, and the group included Virginia Woolf and her brother, all wearing costumes and painted faces.
- Dr. Bennett Clark Hyde was arrested after being charged with murder in the death of Colonel Thomas H. Swope, the wealthiest man in Kansas City, Missouri. Colonel Swope had died suddenly on October 3, 1909, and his exhumed body had traces of strychnine. Dr. Hyde was witnessed giving a pill to the 82-year-old Swope, who died 20 minutes later. Hyde's conviction was reversed on appeal, and two subsequent trials in 1911 ended without a verdict. The case was dismissed in 1917.
- Born: Dominique Pire (born Georges Pire), Belgian friar and humanitarian, 1958 Nobel Peace Prize laureate; in Dinant (d. 1969)

== February 11, 1910 (Friday) ==
- After French explorer Jean-Baptiste Charcot, and the crew of his ship Pourquoi Pas, returned from their Antarctic expedition more than a year after their departure, arriving at Punta Arenas, Chile. Charcot cabled the word that they had failed to reach the South Pole, but was congratulated for having gone further south than any men had gone before.
- Howard Little, who had murdered a family of three adults and three children in Hurley, Virginia, on the previous September 22, was put to death in the electric chair in Richmond.
- The town of Hingham, Montana, was incorporated.

== February 12, 1910 (Saturday) ==
- A force of 2,000 Chinese troops, under the command of General Chao Er-Feng and led by General Chung Ying, marched into Lhasa, the capital of Tibet. The 13th Dalai Lama, Thubten Gyatso, was forced to flee to India in a scene that would be repeated in 1959. A squadron of Tibetan soldiers, commanded by 24-year-old Chensal Namgang and equipped with only 34 rifles, was able to hold off a pursuing force of 200 Chinese troops at the Tsang-po River, giving the Lama enough time to reach British officials.
- The National Negro Committee changed its name to its present name, the National Association for the Advancement of Colored People (NAACP).
- Died: Lewis Wolfley, 70, former Territorial Governor of Arizona, was killed in a streetcar accident.

== February 13, 1910 (Sunday) ==
- Thousands of workers marched in Berlin in protest over the Prussian three-class franchise, a law in which the wealthiest one-fifth of the voters had two-thirds of the seats in Germany's parliament, and were attacked with bayonets by the city police and the Prussian army. Surprisingly, nobody was killed, but 40 were wounded, and led to further uprisings. The Prussian system was finally abolished with the fall of the German Empire in 1918.
- With the completion of excavations at San Pedro Bay, and the annexation of San Pedro and Wilmington into the city of Los Angeles, the name of the Port of San Pedro was changed to Los Angeles Harbor.
- Born: William Shockley, American inventor who won the 1956 Nobel Prize in Physics for his role in inventing the transistor, later a controversial proponent of eugenics; in London, England (d. 1989). Shockley was one of three Nobel laureates born over a five-day period.

== February 14, 1910 (Monday) ==
- In the only shakeup of the four Great Offices of State following the January 1910 United Kingdom general election, 35-year-old Winston Churchill became the Home Secretary in Prime Minister Asquith's cabinet, replacing Herbert Gladstone. Churchill would become Chancellor of the Exchequer in 1924, and Prime Minister of the United Kingdom in 1940.
- The town of Norman, Arkansas, was incorporated.

== February 15, 1910 (Tuesday) ==
- The ILGWU strike against New York's shirtwaist (blouse) factories ended after almost three months. The walkout of 20,000 women began on November 23, and ended after 339 manufacturers agreed to a reduced workweek (52 hours a week rather than 56), increased wages, and union recognition.
- Born: Irena Sendler, Polish social worker who helped more than 2,500 Jewish children, in the Warsaw Ghetto, escape extermination by the Nazis; as Irena Krzyzanowska in Warsaw (d. 2008)

== February 16, 1910 (Wednesday) ==
- Ban Johnson, co-founder and first president of baseball's American League, had his contract renewed by the owners for twenty years at the rate of $25,000 per year. Johnson's power diminished after the creation of the post of Commissioner of Baseball in 1920, and his term as AL president ended in 1927.
- Born: Morgan Smith and Marvin Smith, Harlem's most prominent African-American photographers; in Nicholasville, Kentucky

== February 17, 1910 (Thursday) ==
- A patent for the first gun safety mechanism was filed by the Browning Arms Company for a small component that would "insure absolutely against the dangerous accidental firing sometimes liable to occur if the trigger is pulled after the magazine has been withdrawn in the belief that all cartridges have been removed". U.S. Patent No. 984,519 was granted on February 14, 1911.
- Georges Vézina, the legendary National Hockey League goaltender, helped his Chicoutimi, Quebec semi-pro hockey team upset the Montreal Canadiens in an exhibition, 11–5. The Canadiens were so impressed by the 23-year-old that they quickly offered him a contract. Vezina played for Montreal for 16 seasons.
- Born:
  - Ai Qing (pen name for Jiang Zhenghan), Communist Chinese poet; in Fantianjiang village, Jinhua county, Zhejiang province, (d.1996)
  - Marc Lawrence (stage name for Max Goldsmith), American character actor who portrayed gangsters on film and television; in New York City (d. 2005)

== February 18, 1910 (Friday) ==
- Louis Paulhan made the first airplane flight in Texas, at prairie land south of Houston. The Houston Post paid Paulhan $20,000 to demonstrate his Farman biplane.
- France delivered a 48-hour ultimatum to Morocco, to ratify an agreement to pay back $12,000,000 owed as indemnities, or face the seizure of all tariffs owed Morocco. The Sultan agreed the next day to the terms.

== February 19, 1910 (Saturday) ==
- Old Trafford, the stadium for Manchester United, was opened. A crowd estimated at 80,000 watched as the Red Devils lost to visiting Liverpool F.C., 4–3. Over 100 years, a roof, lighting and seats have been added and the site now seats 76,212.
- Trolley strike in Philadelphia degenerated into violence
- Don Quichotte, an opera by Jules Massenet, based on Miguel de Cervantes' Don Quixote, was presented for the first time.
- Mary Mallon, the disease carrier infamously known as "Typhoid Mary", was released from her confinement at the North Brother Island Hospital, when the New York City health department announced that disease carriers would no longer be held in isolation. Over the protests of health inspector George Soper, who had traced the spread of typhoid to places where Mallon worked as a cook, she was released. Mallon was returned to isolation on North Brother Island on March 27, 1915, where she remained until her death in 1938.
- Born: Dorothy Janis, leading lady in silent films; in Dallas, Texas (died March 10, 2010)

== February 20, 1910 (Sunday) ==
- Boutros Pasha Ghali, the Prime Minister of Egypt, was assassinated as he left the Ministry of Foreign Affairs building. Ibrahim Wardani, a Muslim member of the Nationalist Party, fired five gunshots into Ghali, who died the following day. Ghali, a Coptic Christian governing Egypt when it was a British protectorate, was the grandfather of future United Nations Secretary-General Boutros Boutros-Ghali, who would be born in 1922.

== February 21, 1910 (Monday) ==
- The Cruz Roja de Mexicana, now Mexico's branch of the International Red Cross and Red Crescent Movement, was established by presidential decree. In addition to disaster assistance, the Mexican Red Cross functions as the ambulance service for the nation. Under Mexican law, Cruz Roja emergency workers are the only persons authorized to render first aid for victims of auto accidents or crimes.
- King Edward VII opened the new session of the British Parliament.
- Born:
  - Douglas Bader, British Royal Air Force ace with 22 victories in World War II; in St. John's Wood, London (d. 1982)
  - Carmine Galante, American crime boss; in New York City (killed 1979)
- Died: Boutros Ghali, 63, Egyptian Prime Minister, died the day after being shot by assassins.

== February 22, 1910 (Tuesday) ==
- Ad Wolgast won the world lightweight boxing championship in a "distance fight" against defending champ Battling Nelson, when the bout in Richmond, California, was stopped in the 40th round.
- On the same evening, Frankie Conley won the world bantamweight boxing championship when he knocked out Monte Attell in the 42nd round of a fight at Vernon, California.
- After seven weeks, 58 ballots, and the withdrawal of all but two candidates, the Mississippi legislature elected a new U.S. Senator, with Leroy Percy winning 87–82 over George Vardaman.
- Born: George Tsutakawa, American sculptor; in Seattle (d. 1997)

== February 23, 1910 (Wednesday) ==
- George Bernard Shaw's latest play, Misalliance: A Debate in One Sitting, premiered at the Duke of York's Theatre at London's West End, and baffled critics and audiences.
- A group of 55 passengers boarded the five cars of Great Northern Railroad's Train Number 25 in Spokane, Washington, traveling westward toward Seattle and unaware that they would encounter the deadliest avalanche in U.S. history. After a trip of several hours, Train 25 and Fast Mail Train 27 behind it were stopped by railroad officials on the town of Leavenworth because of a snowstorm that blocked the east side of the Cascade Tunnel. Rather than return to Spokane, Train 25 resumed its trip the next day and proceeded through the tunnel and then became stranded outside the town of Wellington. After five days of being unable to move forward or back, Great Northern Train 25 and the Mail Train 27 were struck by an avalanche on March 1 at 1:42 in the morning. A total of 96 people, passengers and railroad employees, were killed and only 22 people survived.
- The Kingdom of Serbia formed its first Olympic team in order to compete in the 1912 Summer Olympics in Stockholm.
- Died:
  - Vera Komissarzhevskaya, 45, Russian actress and theatrical producer, died of smallpox.
  - Amos Dolbear, 72, American inventor who attempted to prove that he had invented the first telephone (which he called the "talking telegraph") in 1865, but failed to patent it. He fought the claim to the U.S. Supreme Court in the case of Dolbear, et al. v. American Bell Telephone Company but was denied in 1881. Dolbear is also known for Dolbear's law, a formula calculating the relationship between the ambient temperature and the rate at which crickets chirp.

== February 24, 1910 (Thursday) ==
- Malmö FF, which has won more Allsvenskan (All-Swedish) soccer football league titles (20) than any other team, was founded in the port city of Malmö. The club did not join the Allsvenskan until 1931.
- The "American cinephone" was unveiled at a New York press conference, showing technology that might make it possible to have sound on films. A trained cinephone operator would be able to synchronize a film's speed to a phonographic record "so that the gestures of a singer and actor appear at practically the same instant as the sound of the voice".

== February 25, 1910 (Friday) ==
- A grand jury in Newark, New Jersey indicted the National Packing Company and its subsidiaries, Armour, Swift, Morris, and G.H. Hammond, along with 21 executives, on charges of conspiracy to monopolize the nation's meatpacking industry.
- Thomas Edison's "trolleyless street car", powered by storage batteries rather than by overhead electric wires, was publicly demonstrated on New York's 29th Street horse car tracks, with rail executives, transportation engineers and members of the press as passengers. According to Ralph Beach, the "canned current" electric streetcar would "make 150 miles on a single charge", and would be recharged overnight at a power station.

== February 26, 1910 (Saturday) ==
- At Philadelphia, the Columbia University basketball team defeated the University of Pennsylvania, 19-13, to close out its season with a 19–1 record. The Helms Foundation later named Columbia as the best team of the 1909–10 season.
- Austria-Hungary granted most favored nation status to the United States.
- Urging the U.S. Senate Committee on Conservation of Natural Resources to pass a ten-year ban on the hunting of Alaskan seals, Dr. W.T. Hornaday testified that the seal population in the Alaskan territory had been "reduced from 4,000,000 to 50,000 within a comparatively brief period".
- The city of Scottsdale, Arizona, named for General Winfield Scott, was incorporated.
- Western Union created a forerunner of long distance telephone calling, with the inauguration of its new "telegraph-telephone" service, set up on a network of telephone connections between New York's Western Union Building, and local telephone company switchboards. If a phone user wanted to send a telegram from home, the switchboard would, "in less than a minute" connect the caller directly to Western Union, which would then relay the message to the nearest telegraph office, which in turn would deliver the telegram or telephone the recipient, at no extra charge.
- Born: Sergei Gorshkov, "Father of the Soviet Navy"; in Kamenets-Podolski, Ukraine (d.1988)

== February 27, 1910 (Sunday) ==
- An avalanche sent tons of snow through the mining town of Mace, Idaho, killing at least 11 people, followed a few hours later by a snowslide through the town of Burke, killing five more. By the next day, four more avalanches had raised the death toll to 31 in Shoshone County, Idaho. One hundred years later, Mace and Burke are considered to be "ghost towns".
- Born: Joan Bennett, American film actress known for Father of the Bride; in Palisades Park, New Jersey (d. 1990)

== February 28, 1910 (Monday) ==
- The last legal bare-knuckle boxing bout in the United States took place in Passaic, New Jersey, as Leo Baker and Dave Smith fought 32 rounds without gloves, with the match ending in a draw.
- The town of Elk Horn, Iowa, was incorporated.
