= December 1909 =

Month in 1909

<<	December 1909					>>
Su	Mo	Tu	We	Th	Fr	Sa
			1	2	3	4
5	6	7	8	9	10	11
12	13	14	15	16	17	18
19	20	21	22	23	24	25
26	27	28	29	30	31

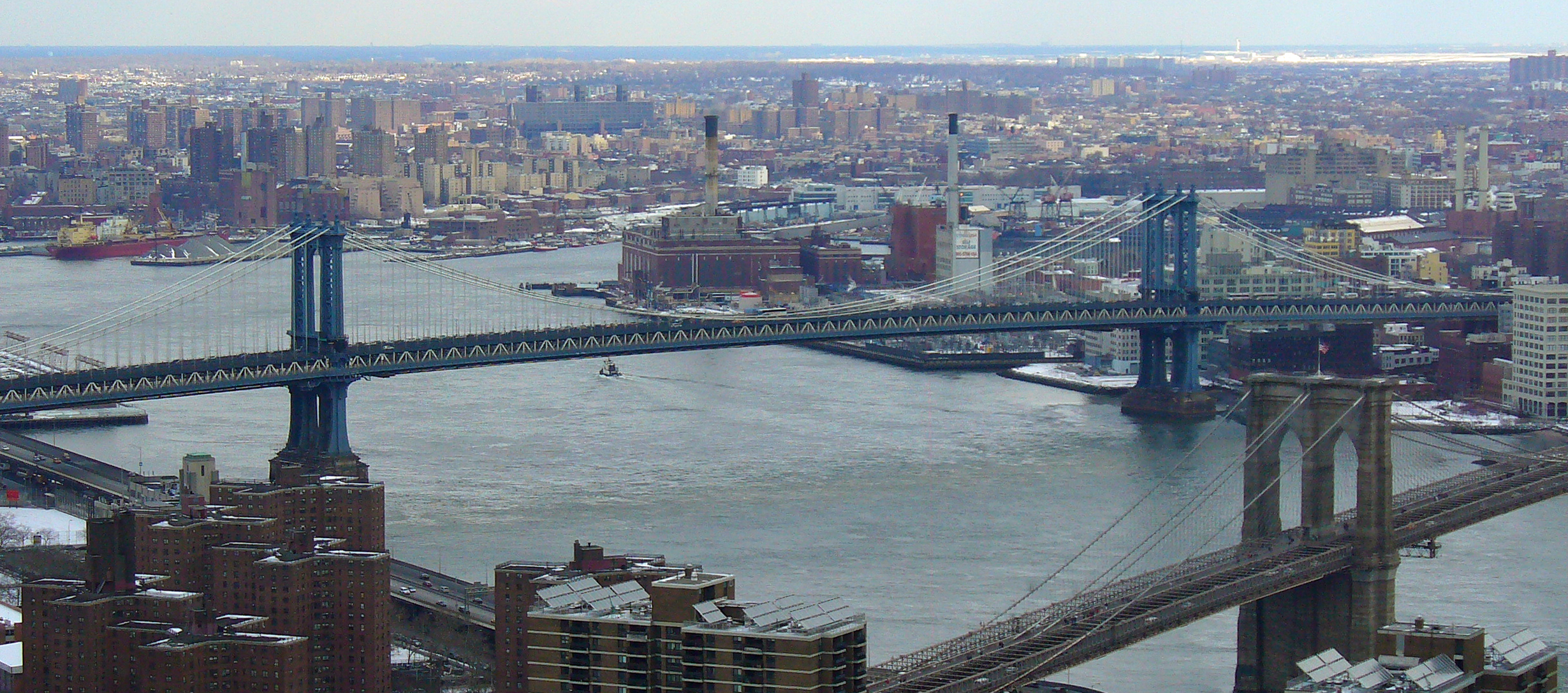
December 31, 1909: Manhattan Bridge opens

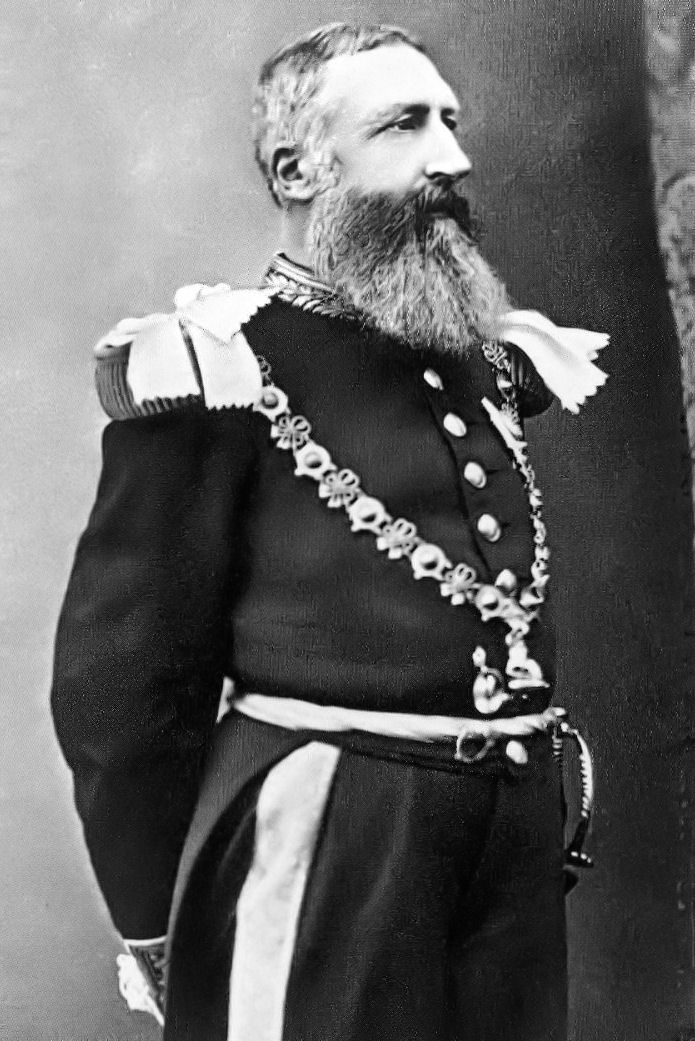
December 17, 1909: Belgium's King Leopold II dies

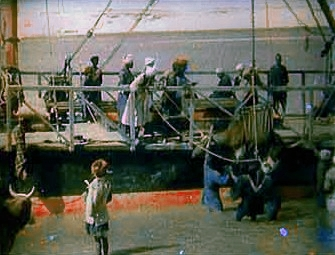
December 31, 1909: Kinemacolor film first shown in theater

The following events occurred in December 1909:

== December 1, 1909 (Wednesday) ==
- The United States severed diplomatic relations with Nicaragua, with Secretary of State Knox ordering the Nicaraguan charge d'affaires to leave.
- Aleksandër Xhuvani University, the first university in Albania, was founded in Elbasan as a teacher's college, the Shkolla Normale e Elbasanit.
- The payout from the first "Christmas club" was made, by the Carlisle (Pa.) Trust Company.
- Born: Franz Bardon, in Katherein, Austria-Hungary (now Opava, Czech Republic) (d. 1958)

== December 2, 1909 (Thursday) ==
Union of South Africa flag used until 1928

- The Union of South Africa was created by royal proclamation of the South Africa Act 1909 (9 Edw. 7. c. 9), the act of Parliament that consolidated four British colonies.
- The National Hockey Association, forerunner of the National Hockey League, was founded.
- Giovanni Giolitti resigned as Prime Minister of Italy. He was succeeded by Sidney Sonnino.
- The first airplane flight in Turkey was made by Baron De Cotters.

== December 3, 1909 (Friday) ==
- Two British ships sank in a storm in the Irish Sea, killing more than 60 people. SS Ellan Vannin sank as it sailed from Ramsey on the Isle of Man, on its way to Liverpool, with the loss of 32 people (21 crew and 11 passengers). The 30-member crew of the freighter SS Thistledor drowned in Bideford Bay off the coast of Appledore, Torridge.
- The British House of Commons was dissolved and elections were called for January by Prime Minister Asquith.

== December 4, 1909 (Saturday) ==
- King Gustaf V of Sweden disguised himself and spent a day working as a stevedore, so that he could see working conditions first hand. "Mr. Bernadotte" spent the day unloading sacks of coal at a Stockholm harbor.
- The Montreal Canadiens were founded.
- The first Grey Cup game was played, with the University of Toronto defeating Parkdale Canoe Club 26–6 at Rosedale Field in Toronto.
- The New York Amsterdam News, an African-American newspaper founded by James H. Anderson, published its first issue.
- Edward Sheldon's play The Nigger opened on Broadway. Later made into a novel (1910) and a film (1915), the play was described by critic George Jean Nathan as one of the "ten dramatic shocks of the century". One historian notes that the play "is, despite its politically incorrect title, a prominent defense of miscegenation".
- American Cyanamid shipped its first carload of cyanamide fertilizer. The chemical manufacturer later diversified, producing products such as Centrum vitamins, Old Spice after shave, and Pine-Sol cleaner.

== December 5, 1909 (Sunday) ==
- The first manned glider flights in Australia and Japan took place on the same day. At Narrabeen, New South Wales, George Augustine Taylor flew in a glider of his own design, and his wife Florence Mary Taylor flew the same day. A boy near Tokyo flew on a biplane glider built by Yves le Prieur and Lt. Shirou Aibara.
- In a duel fought between two members of the Senate of Bolivia, Senator Adolfo Trigo Acha shot and killed Senator Emilio Fernandez Molina. Trigo continued to serve as the Senator from Tarija Department.

== December 6, 1909 (Monday) ==
- Saratov State University was founded in the Russian city of Saratov.
- Antonio Fernandez of Spain became only the fourth person in history to die in an airplane crash, when his aircraft fell apart while he was flying at Nice.
- Born:
  - Freddy Martin, American bandleader; in Cleveland (d. 1983)
  - Rulon Jeffs, President of the Fundamentalist Church of Jesus Christ of Latter-Day Saints; in Salt Lake City (d. 2002)

== December 7, 1909 (Tuesday) ==
- United States patent No. 942,700 was granted for Bakelite ("Condensation product of phenol and formaldehyde and method of making the same"), the first synthetic plastic, and patent No. 942,809 for the process, both to Leo Baekeland.
- SS Marquette & Bessemer No. 2, a 350-foot-long (110 m) ferry, departed from Conneaut, Ohio, at 11:00 a.m., bound for Port Stanley, Ontario, and was never seen again. One of the 49 persons on board was carrying $32,000 in a briefcase. The ship went down in Lake Erie and had not been located as of 2009.
- Calvin Coolidge defeated Henry E. Bicknell to win election as Mayor of Northampton, Massachusetts, his first political office.
- The town of Anderson, Missouri, was incorporated.
- Born:
  - Nikola Vaptsarov, Bulgarian poet; in Bansko (d. 1942)
  - Teddy Hill, American bandleader; in Birmingham, Alabama (d. 1978)
- Died: Whitcomb Judson, 66, American inventor

== December 8, 1909 (Wednesday) ==
- Colonel Sergey Karpov, director of Russia's secret police, the Okhrana, was assassinated in the Russian capital of St. Petersburg. Aleksandr Petrov, a Bolshevik who had infiltrated the Okhrana, planted the bomb that killed the security chief.

== December 9, 1909 (Thursday) ==
- The British General Post Office announced the first cable money transfer agreement between the United Kingdom and the United States, to take effect on January 1, 1910. Under the new service, money could be wired between British post offices and Western Union telegraph stations in the United States, with orders transmitted via transatlantic cable.
- Born: Douglas Fairbanks, Jr., American film actor; in New York City (d. 2000)

== December 10, 1909 (Friday) ==
- The University of Queensland was established by Act of State Parliament. In 1911, 83 students began their first classes in Brisbane.
- Died: Red Cloud, 88, Oglala Sioux leader

== December 11, 1909 (Saturday) ==
- Twenty-six Muslims, found guilty of the massacre of Armenians in Adana on April 14, 1909, were publicly executed in Constantinople.
- The first Canadian football game played in the United States took place in New York City at Van Courtland Park, before 15,000 fans. The Hamilton Tigers beat the Ottawa Rough Riders 11–6.
- Kinemacolor, the first process for motion pictures in color, was demonstrated at Madison Square Garden.

== December 12, 1909 (Sunday) ==
- The only persons known to have escaped the sinking of the Bessemer and Marquette ferry were found in a lifeboat on Lake Erie, frozen to death.
- Born: Karen Morley (stage name for Mildred Linton), blacklisted American actress; in Ottumwa, Iowa (d. 2003)

== December 13, 1909 (Monday) ==
- On his deathbed, King Leopold II of Belgium married Caroline Lacroix, his mistress and the mother of his two sons, Lucien and Philippe. The King died four days later and was succeeded by his brother. The marriage, performed as a religious ceremony but not a civil ceremony, was not recognized under Belgian law, and Lucien was ineligible to succeed to the throne. Lucien Durieux lived until November 15, 1984.
- Died: George Salting, 74, British millionaire and art collector

== December 14, 1909 (Tuesday) ==
- The colonial government in British East Africa (now Kenya) set aside as the Southern Game Reserve.
- New South Wales Premier Charles Wade signed the Seat of Government Surrender Act 1909, formally completing the transfer of State land to the Commonwealth to create the Australian Capital Territory.
- Born:
  - Edward Lawrie Tatum, American geneticist, 1958 Nobel laureate; in Boulder, Colorado (d. 1975)
  - "Symphony Sid" (stage name for Sidney Tarnopol), American jazz publicist; in New York City (d. 1984)

== December 15, 1909 (Wednesday) ==
- Japan dispatched 2,000 cherry blossom trees to the United States, as the steamship Kaga Maru sailed from Yokohama. By way of Seattle, the trees would arrive in Washington, D.C., on January 6.
- The 28-mile (45 km) long Royal Military Canal, completed in 1809 at a cost of £234,310, was paid for after a century, with the collection of the final toll for its use (at Iden Lock).
- The National Geographic Society acknowledged Robert E. Peary to be the discoverer of the North Pole, more than three months after Peary and Frederick Cook had both claimed to have been there.
- The first attempt to create a Cooperative Extension Service in the United States was made when Michigan Congressman James C. McLaughlin introduced a bill for its funding. The Smith-Lever Act of 1914 passed three years later.
- The town of Kermit, West Virginia, was incorporated.
- The first Radisson Hotel was opened. Located on 41 South Seventh Street in Minneapolis, Minnesota, the 16-story building was constructed by heiress Edna Dickerson and had 425 rooms. By 2009, there were 420 Radisson hotels worldwide.
- Died: Francisco Tárrega, 57, Spanish composer

== December 16, 1909 (Thursday) ==
- José Santos Zelaya resigned as President of Nicaragua as American warships approached that nation's coasts. In a message to the Congress, Zelaya wrote that he resigned in hopes of "the re-establishment of peace, particularly the suspension of the hostility of the United States". Zelaya was succeeded by José Madriz, who later resigned under American pressure.
- The village of Duson, Louisiana, was incorporated.

== December 17, 1909 (Friday) ==
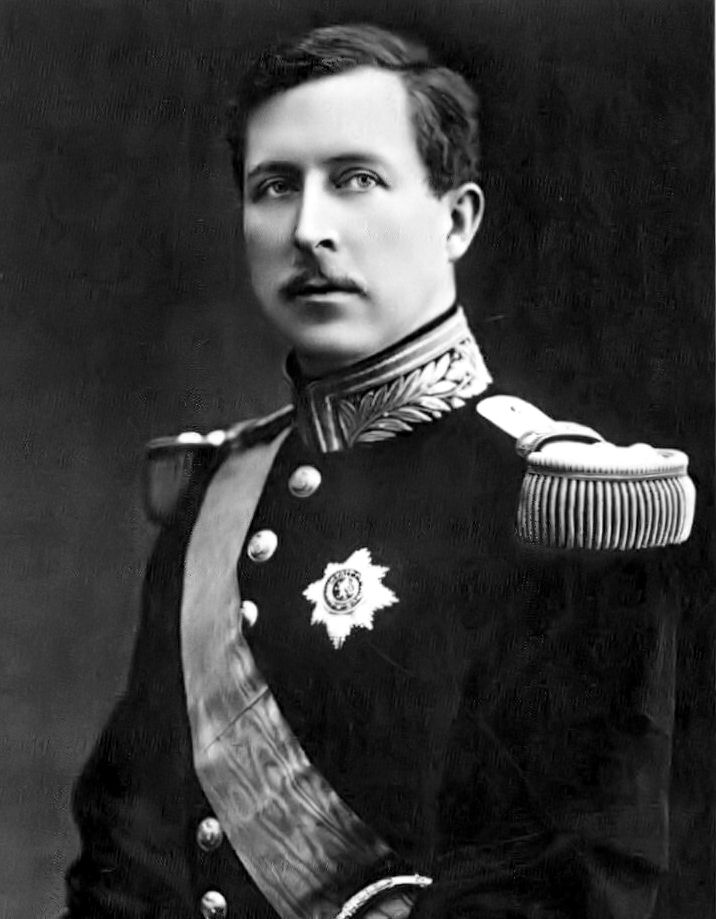
Albert I

- King Leopold II of Belgium died in Brussels at 2:35 a.m. He was succeeded by his nephew, who was crowned as King Albert I.
- The last brick was placed at the track of the Indianapolis Motor Speedway, as Indiana Governor (and future U.S. Vice-President) Thomas R. Marshall placed a 52-pound (24 kg) gold-plated block into the track. The Speedway then staged its first—and last—midwinter race in bitter, near-zero weather.

== December 18, 1909 (Saturday) ==
- Albert Kimmerling became the first pilot in South Africa.
- U.S. Secretary of State Philander C. Knox sent a diplomatic note to his counterpart in Japan, challenging the expansion of both Empires into China. As part of President Taft's policy of "Dollar Diplomacy", Knox proposed to Japan's Foreign Minister, Komura Jutarō, that foreign-built railways in Manchuria be made neutral to promote economic development. After a January 6 press statement by Knox described the U.S., Britain, Germany and France as "the four great capitalist nations" setting an example for China, Japan and Russia rejected the proposal and agreed to divide their spheres of influence. Historian A. Whitney Griswold later wrote that in trying to advance the Open Door Policy, Knox had "nailed that door closed with himself on the outside".

== December 19, 1909 (Sunday) ==

- Borussia Dortmund, Germany's most popular soccer football club, was founded. The team won eight national championships, including the 2002 Bundesliga, and has the largest attendance in Germany.

== December 20, 1909 (Monday) ==
- An expeditionary force of 709 U.S. Marines and 32 officers, led by Colonel James E. Mahoney, arrived at Corinto, Nicaragua on the U.S.S. Buffalo, with orders to invade, if necessary, to protect American interests.
- The first cinema in Ireland, the Volta Cinematograph, was opened as a business venture by novelist James Joyce and other partners. Joyce sold his interest in May 1910.
- The city of Malden, Washington, was incorporated.
- Born:
  - Charlie Conacher, "the Canadian Jim Thorpe", member of both the Hockey Hall of Fame and the Canadian Football Hall of Fame; in Toronto (d. 1967)
  - Vakkom Majeed, Indian freedom fighter; in Trivandrum, Princely State of Travancore, British India (now Thiruvananthapuram, Kerala state) (d. 2000)
  - Vagn Holmboe, Danish composer; in Horsens (d. 1996); and

== December 21, 1909 (Tuesday) ==
- A special consistory at the University of Copenhagen reached its findings concerning Dr. Frederick A. Cook. "The documents handed the University for examination," a statement held, "do not contain observations and information which can be regarded as proof that Dr. Cook reached the North Pole on his recent expedition." Robert Peary, who had telegraphed his discovery on September 6, only to find that Cook claimed five days earlier to have been first to the Pole, sent a telegram saying "Congratulations to The New York Times for its steady, insistent, victorious stand for the truth."
- General Electric began marketing of the Mazda name, setting minimum standards for manufacturers of light bulbs with a longer-lasting tungsten filament, and electric lamps, making the light bulb more popular. The trademark, now associated with the automobile, was discontinued by GE in 1945.
- The Kansas City Zoo opened at Swope Park.
- Born:
  - Seicho Matsumoto, Japanese writer and journalist; in Kokura, Fukuoka Prefecture (d. 1992)
  - George W. Ball, U.S. diplomat; in Des Moines, Iowa (d. 1994)
  - Zoya Fyodorova, Russian film actress; in St. Petersburg (d. 1981)
  - Edgar Stoëbel, French Algerian painter, in Frenda, French Algeria (d. 2001)

== December 22, 1909 (Wednesday) ==
- Thousands of people in Worcester, Massachusetts and neighboring towns witnessed a mysterious airship that hovered over the city and shone a searchlight. The sighting followed claims by inventor Wallace Tillinghast that he had invented an airplane that could fly 120 miles per hour (190 km/h).
- Born:
  - Alan Carney, American comedian; in Brooklyn (d. 1973)
  - Patricia Hayes, British actress and comedian; in Wandsworth, London (d. 1998)
- Died: Jimmy Sebring, 27, American major league baseball player for the Pittsburgh Pirates who hit the first home run in the first World Series, died of kidney failure four months after his last major league game.

== December 23, 1909 (Thursday) ==
- The battleship USS Utah, described as "the most powerful vessel of the Navy" because of its ten 12-inch guns, was launched from the Camden, New Jersey, shipyards. The Utah was sunk at Pearl Harbor on December 7, 1941.
- Born:
  - Barney Ross (ring name for Dov-Ber Rasofsky), American boxer, world welterweight champion 1934 to 1938, world lightweight champion 1933 to 1935; in New York City (d. 1967)
  - Giulio Racah, Italian-born Israeli mathematician and physicist; in Florence (d. 1965)
  - Herman Barron, American golfer; in Port Chester, New York (d. 1978)
  - Maurice Denham, British character actor on film, radio and TV, voice actor in animation; in Beckenham, Kent (d. 2002)

== December 24, 1909 (Friday) ==
- The federal court in Boston ruled in the case In re Halladjian (174 F. 834) that Armenians were of the White race, and thus eligible to become naturalized citizens. Earlier, Jacob Halladjian and three other people were denied citizenship on grounds that they were "Asiatics".
- Toyohiko Kagawa established the Kyureidan, a Christian mission and social welfare organization, in Kobe, Japan. In 1914, the organization was renamed the Jesus Band, which celebrated its centennial in 2009.

== December 25, 1909 (Saturday) ==
- After an absence of more than a year, the 13th Dalai Lama, Thubten Gyatso, returned to Lhasa. The ruler of Tibet had journeyed to Beijing in 1908 to meet with the Manchu Emperor, but refused to kowtow to him, and fled at the beginning of 1909, arriving home ahead of the Chinese army. The first soldiers arrived on February 12, 1910, and the Dalai Lama fled again.
- Engineer Cândido Rondon and his remaining 14 men completed a six-month, 900-mile (1,400 km) expedition into the Amazon jungles of the interior of Brazil, arriving at the town of Primor, where they were finally able to get resupplied, four months after running out of food. Rondon, who returned to a hero's welcome in Rio de Janeiro, succeeded in extending telegraph wires to form a communications network across Brazil.
- Born: Zora Arkus-Duntov, Belgian-born U.S. designer of the Corvette automobile; in Brussels (d. 1996)

== December 26, 1909 (Sunday) ==
- American painter, sculptor and author Frederic Remington died at the age of 48, six days after becoming ill with appendicitis at a New York exhibition of his paintings. By the time he underwent surgery on December 23, his appendix had burst and peritonitis had set in.

== December 27, 1909 (Monday) ==
- Five days after the sudden death of Mississippi's U.S. Senator Anselm J. McLaurin, Governor Noel appointed James Gordon, a 76-year-old former colonel in the Confederate Army, had admitted to having met with John Wilkes Booth in Montreal shortly before the assassination of Abraham Lincoln. At one time, a $10,000 reward had been offered by the United States government for his capture, dead or alive, though it was later concluded that he had not been a conspirator.

== December 28, 1909 (Tuesday) ==
- Aviator Albert Kimmerling made the first airplane flight in Africa, taking off at the Nahoon Racetrack at East London, South Africa.
- Voters in six incorporated communities in Hudson County, New Jersey, overwhelmingly rejected a proposal to consolidate their towns into one city. North Bergen, West New York, Weehawken, Guttenberg, West Hoboken and Union Hill would have become one city, to be named by the six Mayors. Union Hill and West Hoboken later merged as Union City, New Jersey.
- Hüseyin Hilmi Pasha, the Turkish Prime Minister, resigned, along with the entire cabinet. Ibrahim Hakki Pasha became the new Grand Vizier on January 12.

== December 29, 1909 (Wednesday) ==
- Ah Hoon, well known in New York as a Chinese American comedian, became a casualty of the tong wars. The Hip Sing gang had delivered a message to him, announcing "the exact hour and the minute he would die", because of insults to them in Hoon's comic routine. Although many sources list December 30 as the evening of Ah Hoon's last performance and murder, his body was discovered in the early morning hours of the 30th.

== December 30, 1909 (Thursday) ==
- The Russian Ministry of Internal Affairs decreed that baptism ceremonies could not be performed outdoors (such as in a lake or river) without a permit, because they qualified as a "religious procession".
- Born: Milton Rogovin, American photographer; in New York City (d. 2011)

== December 31, 1909 (Friday) ==
- At 2:00 pm, the 6,855-foot-long (2,089 m) Manhattan Bridge was opened to traffic, after eight years and 26 million dollars had been spent on its construction. New York City Mayor George B. McClellan Jr., who was on the last day of his term of office, rode in the first automobile of a motorcade from Manhattan to Brooklyn.
- Pope Pius X issued the decree Quinquennial Visit Ad Limina, requiring all Roman Catholic bishops to issue a quinquennial (every five years) report to the Vatican on the state of their diocese, starting in 1911.
