= January 1910 =

Month of 1910

<<	January 1910					>>
Su	Mo	Tu	We	Th	Fr	Sa
						1
2	3	4	5	6	7	8
9	10	11	12	13	14	15
16	17	18	19	20	21	22
23	24	25	26	27	28	29
30	31

The following events occurred in January 1910:

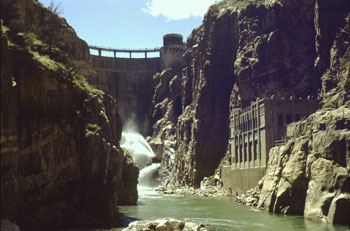
January 15, 1910: 325-foot-high Shoshone River Dam, world's tallest, completed in Wyoming

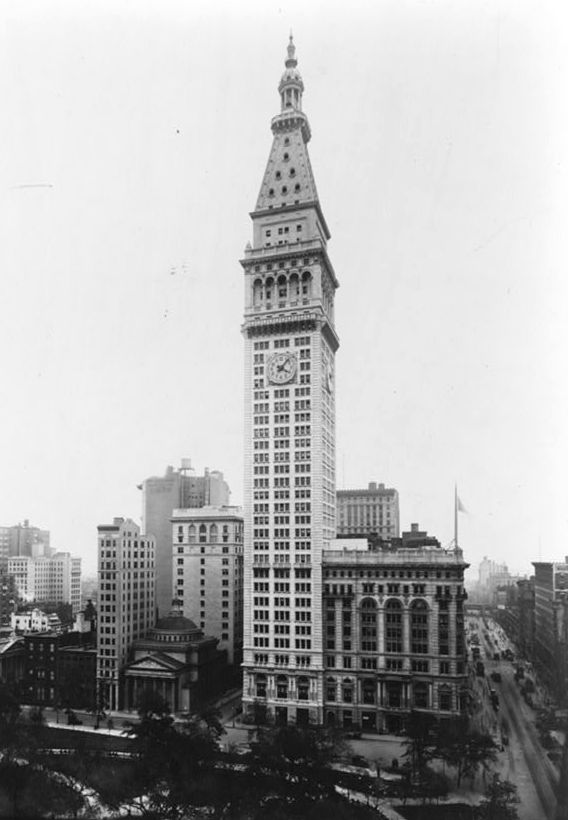
January 22, 1910: 700-foot high Metropolitan Life Tower, world's tallest building, completed

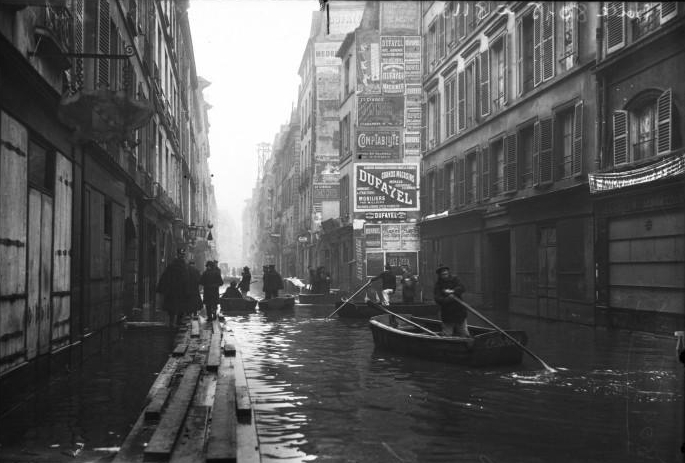
January 21, 1910: Seine River overflows its banks in Paris

== January 1, 1910 (Saturday) ==
- Russia extended its boundaries to 12 miles (19 km) off its coasts.
- U.S. President William H. Taft opened the New Year by inviting the general public to visit him in the White House. He shook hands with 5,575 people.
- By agreement with the labor union, the Brotherhood of Railway Trainmen, American railroad companies in the South implemented a quota against further hiring of African Americans, providing that "No larger percentage of Negro trainmen or yardmen will be employed on any division or in any yard than was employed on January 1, 1910".

== January 2, 1910 (Sunday) ==
- Twelve people in Sawtelle, California (now part of Los Angeles) were fatally poisoned by a contaminated can of pears, served as dessert following dinner at the home of Mrs. D. G. Valdez. Mrs. Valdez, her daughter, five grandchildren, two sons-in-law and three guests all died within days.
- Born: Charles Douglass, American sound engineer credited with inventing the "laugh track" for television programs; to American parents in Guadalajara in Mexico (d. 2003)
- Died: Agnes Booth, 66, American stage actress

== January 3, 1910 (Monday) ==
- The first junior high school classes in the United States began, as a new program in Berkeley, California, was started for seventh, eighth and ninth grade students, at McKinley High School and Washington High School. The idea of the "introductory high school" was conceived by educator Frank Forest Bunker.
- The first injunction in favor of the Wright brothers, against their competitors, was issued by a federal court in Buffalo, barring Glenn Curtiss from flying airplanes for profit while the patent infringement case of Wright v. Herring-Curtis was in progress. An injunction was sought by the Wrights the next day against Louis Paulhan. Curtis filed an interlocutory appeal and posted a $10,000 bond to stay the injunction.
- In a half billion dollar merger agreement, J. P. Morgan's Guaranty Trust Company announced the acquisition of Levi P. Morton's Morton Trust and Thomas Fortune Ryan's Fifth Avenue Trust. On the same day, President Taft conferred at the White House with presidents of the major American railroads, who were unsuccessful in attempting to persuade the President to call off antitrust litigation against the railways.

== January 4, 1910 (Tuesday) ==
- The forces of the Sultan Dudmurrah massacred French forces under the command of Captain Fiegenschuh in a battle in the Darfur region of the Sudan.
- French aviator Léon Delagrange, who had set a flying speed record the previous Thursday, was killed during an airshow at Bordeaux. The wings on his Blériot monoplane broke as he was making a turn, and he plunged 65 feet (20 m) to his death.
- On the same day, aviation pioneer Alberto Santos-Dumont escaped fatal injury when his Demoiselle airplane lost a wing at an altitude of 100 feet (30 m). He was entangled in wire, and spared from being thrown on impact, but never piloted an airplane again.

== January 5, 1910 (Wednesday) ==
- The Montreal Canadiens played their first game of ice hockey, defeating the Cobalt Silver Kings, 7–6. Edouard "Newsy" Lalonde scored the first Canadiens' goal.
- Born: Jack Lovelock, New Zealand track star, 1500 m Olympic medalist in 1936; in Crushington (killed in accident, 1949)
- Died: Léon Walras, 75, French economist, founder of theory of general economic equilibrium

== January 6, 1910 (Thursday) ==
- The Abé people, in the French West Africa colony of Côte d'Ivoire, rose in rebellion against the administration of Governor Gabriel Angoulvant, attacking railway stations and cutting the railway line at 25 separate points. Governor-General Merlaud-Ponty ordered 1,400 troops to brutally suppress the rebellion.
- Born:
  - Wright Morris, American photographer and writer; in Central City, Nebraska (d.1998)
  - Kid Chocolate, (ring name for Eligio Sardinias-Montalbo), Cuban boxer; in Cerro, Havana (d.1988)

== January 7, 1910 (Friday) ==
- Hubert Latham became the first person to fly an airplane to an altitude of more than 1 kilometre (0.62 mi), breaking his own world record at Mourmelon-le-Grand, France.
- The Pinchot–Ballinger controversy, which would ultimately split the Republican Party and lead to the election of Woodrow Wilson as President of the United States, began when President Taft ordered the firing of Forestry Director Gifford Pinchot. Pinchot's criticism of Interior Secretary Richard A. Ballinger, including a letter read on the floor of the United States Congress, led to the dismissal. "By your conduct you have destroyed your usefulness as a helpful subordinate of the government", Taft wrote, "and it therefore now becomes my duty to direct the Secretary of Agriculture to remove you from your office as the Forester."
- Born:
  - Orval Faubus, Governor of Arkansas (1955–1967); in Huntsville, Arkansas (d. 1994)
  - Gleb Lozino-Lozinskiy, Ukrainian-Soviet developer of the Soviet space shuttle Buran; in Kiev (d. 2001)

== January 8, 1910 (Saturday) ==
- Bhutan became a protectorate of the British Empire by the signing of the Treaty of Punakha. The agreement, executed by King Ugyen Wangchuk and British representative Charles Alfred Bell, kept the Himalayan kingdom separate from British India.
- Born: Galina Ulanova, Russian ballerina; in St. Petersburg (d. 1998)

== January 9, 1910 (Sunday) ==
- General rioting and anti-Shia pogroms broke out in Bukhara, at that time a Russian protectorate, when Sunni Muslim madrasa students insulted a Shi'ite Muslim group that was commemorating the Mourning of Muharram. With the Bukhara Emir refusing to intervene, Russian troops were sent in to maintain order. After several more interventions, Bukhara eventually became part of the Soviet Union and is now part of Uzbekistan.
- Born: Michel Aflaq, Syrian political theorist, founder of Ba'athism; in Damascus (d. 1989)

== January 10, 1910 (Monday) ==
- Parliament was dissolved in the United Kingdom, and new elections were held over a two-week period beginning on January 15.
- Died: Chief Charlo, 79, Chief of the Bitterroot Salish Indian tribe from 1870 to 1910
- The British Liner RMS Lusitania encountered a 75 feet (23 m) high wave that damaged its forward superstructure en route to New York. No injuries or deaths were reported.

== January 11, 1910 (Tuesday) ==
- Charcot Island discovered by Antarctic expedition led by French explorer Jean-Baptiste Charcot, who was sailing on the ship Pourquoi Pas?. Charcot Land, later proven to be an island, was named in honor Charcot's father.

== January 12, 1910 (Wednesday) ==
- İbrahim Hakkı Pasha became the new Grand Vizier of the Ottoman Empire, replacing Hüseyin Hilmi Pasha.
- The steamer Czarina wrecked on the rocks off of the coast of Marshfield, Oregon. Despite the attempts of city residents and the U.S. life-saving station, only one of the 30 people on board survived.
- Andover, Iowa, was incorporated as a city.
- First observation of the Great January Comet of 1910.
- Born: Luise Rainer, German-born Academy Award winner for Best Actress in 1936 and 1937; in Düsseldorf (d. 2014)

== January 13, 1910 (Thursday) ==
- The first radio broadcast of a live musical performance took place from New York's Metropolitan Opera, which inaugurated use of a new system set up by Lee de Forest. The one-act opera Cavalleria rusticana was "borne by Hertzian waves over the turbulent waters of the sea to transcontinental and coastwise ships, and over the mountain peaks, amid undulating valleys of the country" with the aid of a microphone connected to a 500-watt transmitter. Wireless receivers at buildings on Park Avenue, the Metropolitan Life Building, and Times Square picked up the broadcast, as did radio sets used by ship operators and amateur radio enthusiasts.

== January 14, 1910 (Friday) ==
- Spain's King Alfonso ordered the arrest of 80 high-ranking military officers suspected of plotting a coup, and removed the Captains General of Madrid, Valencia, Valladolid and Coronna. Police surrounded the Military Club in Madrid and took the officers inside into custody.

== January 15, 1910 (Saturday) ==
- Voting began in the United Kingdom for a new parliament.
- The Shoshone River Dam, later the Buffalo Bill Dam, was completed in Wyoming. At 325 feet (99 m) in height, it was, at that time, the tallest dam in the world.

== January 16, 1910 (Sunday) ==
- A boycott against the high price of meat began in Cleveland, Ohio, with 460 people pledging not to purchase meat until prices came down. Within ten days, the boycott spread to include 150,000 Clevelanders refusing to purchase meat and similar protests were spreading across the nation.
- Stefanos Dragoumis became the new Prime Minister of Greece, succeeding Kyriakoulis Mavromichalis. Dragoumis was approved by the Crown Council with a 14–4 vote over Stefanos Skouloudis.
- Born: Dizzy Dean (Jay Hanna Dean), legendary pitcher for St. Louis Cardinals; in Lucas, Arkansas (d. 1974)

== January 17, 1910 (Monday) ==
- By a voice vote, the U.S. House of Representatives unanimously approved a bill calling for statehood for the territories of Arizona and New Mexico. House Resolution 18166, sponsored by Michigan Congressman Edward L. Hamilton, moved on to the United States Senate.
- Born: Edith Green, U.S. Representative for Oregon, 1955 to 1975); in Trent, South Dakota (d. 1987)

== January 18, 1910 (Tuesday) ==
- The "Daylight Comet" became visible during daylight hours six days after it had been first observed from Earth, then declined in brightness over the next six weeks before traveling away from the Sun and was not seen again. The astronomical body was brighter than the more famous Halley's Comet that would be visible to the naked eye at night time in April, and remains the brightest comet seen from Earth in the 20th century.
- A fire at Constantinople, the Turkish capital of the Ottoman Empire, destroyed the Palace of Charagan, residence of the Sultan, as well as the parliament buildings.
- John R. Walsh, the 72-year-old former President of the Chicago National Bank, began a five-year sentence at the federal prison in Leavenworth. The day before, the United States Supreme Court declined to review the appeal of his conviction for misuse of the funds of the Bank, which had failed in 1906. Walsh had been a self-made millionaire, working his way "from newsboy to the control of millions of dollars in banks, railroads, newspapers and coal-fields"

== January 19, 1910 (Wednesday) ==
- The United States Army first experimented with aerial bombardment from an airplane, with Louis Paulhan piloting and Lieutenant Paul Beck dropping dummy bombs (sacks of sand) upon targets from an altitude of 350 feet (110 m).

== January 20, 1910 (Thursday) ==
- Heavyweight boxing champion Jack Johnson was arrested for assault in New York, but released later. He would defend his title later in the year in the "Fight of the Century" against former champion James J. Jeffries.
- Born: Joy Adamson, author of the book Born Free; as Friederike Gessner in Troppau, Austria-Hungary (now Opava, Czech Republic (d. 1980)

== January 21, 1910 (Friday) ==
- Two days after heavy rains poured upon France, the Seine river overflowed its banks at 10:50 a.m. Over the next several days, the rains continued and the waters rose 24 feet (7.3 m), overran power stations and blacked out the city, forced hundreds of thousands to flee their homes, and contaminated the water supply with disease. The waters did not begin receding until January 28, and would cause 400 million francs of damage. Flooding also took place of the Doubs river in the Departments of Doubs, Jura and Saône-et-Loire.
- A railway accident killed 48 people and injured 92 others when a Canadian Pacific train ran off the rails as it was crossing a bridge, plunging into the Spanish River in Ontario. The final death toll was 63.
- The U.S. Department of Justice announced that it would seek to break up the "beef trust".
- Born: Albert Rosellini, U.S. politician who was Governor of Washington from 1957 to 1965; in Tacoma, Washington (d. 2011)

== January 22, 1910 (Saturday) ==
- At 9:30 in the evening, the Vigarano Meteorite split as it fell to Earth in Italy at the locality of the same name, near Emilia. Weighing 11.5 kg (or 25 lb.), the stone that was recovered was the first of the CV chondrites named for Vigarano. CV chondrites are described as the oldest rocks in the Solar System. The other piece of the meteorite, weighing 4.5 kilograms (9.9 lb), was found a month later. The famous Allende meteorite of 1969 is a CV3.
- The completion of construction of New York's Metropolitan Life Insurance Company Tower, at 700 feet (210 m) tall the world's tallest skyscraper at the time, was celebrated by the company at the Hotel Astor.
- Born: Harold Geneen, English-born U.S. businessman, Chairman of International Telephone and Telegraph (ITT Corporation from 1959 to 1977; in Bournemouth, Hampshire (d. 1997)

== January 23, 1910 (Sunday) ==
- Two days after heavy rains had caused the River Seine to overflow its banks, flooding of the river valleys of France broke the previous records, and the waters kept rising.
- Born: Django Reinhardt, Belgian guitarist; in Liberchies (d. 1953)

== January 24, 1910 (Monday) ==
- At the annual meetings of baseball's major leagues, held in Pittsburgh, the National League's schedule committee tentatively approved a resolution to add another 14 games to each team's schedule, for 168 regular season games. The American League declined to follow suit, so the NL retained a 154-game schedule for 1910, and the next 50 seasons. In 1961, the American League went to the current 162 games, followed by the NL the next year.

== January 25, 1910 (Tuesday) ==
- The army of Nicaragua was defeated by rebel troops in a battle at La Libertad. President José Madriz would finally yield to the rebels in August.
- The Poás Volcano erupted in Costa Rica for the first time since 1885, sending ash 26,000 feet into the air.

== January 26, 1910 (Wednesday) ==
- The Hague Convention of 1907, governing naval warfare, entered into effect by its terms.
- The Mann Act, sponsored by Congressman James Mann of Illinois, passed the U.S. House of Representatives by a voice vote. The bill made a federal crime of transporting a person in interstate travel (initially by "purchase of a ticket") for purposes of prostitution, punishable by a $5,000 fine, a five-year jail term, or both. The bill moved on to the U.S. Senate.
- Glenn Curtiss tested the first seaplane, which he had made by attaching a broad main float to the underside, with three takeoffs and landings made at San Diego Bay.
- As parliamentary elections in the United Kingdom continued, the coalition led by Prime Minister H. H. Asquith retained power. In spite of Asquith's Liberal Party, along with the Labor and Irish Nationalist parties, combined for at least 345 of the 670 seats in the House of Commons. Asquith himself was confronted by angry suffragettes until the police came to his rescue.
- Carrie Nation made her last attempt at wrecking a saloon, as she invaded a dance hall in Butte, Montana, but was warded off by proprietor May Malloy. Nation, who destroyed saloons and taverns at the beginning of the century, would die the following year.

== January 27, 1910 (Thursday) ==
- Gunnar Knudsen resigned his position as Prime Minister of Norway, and was succeeded on February 2 by Wollert Konow.
- Born: Félix Candela, Spanish architectural engineer; in Madrid (d. 1997) and Edvard Kardelj, Yugoslav political leader, economist, partisan and publicist (d. 1979).
- Died: Thomas Crapper, 73, English manufacturer who popularized the flush toilet.

== January 28, 1910 (Friday) ==
- Shortly after the original gift, from Japan, of 2,000 Japanese cherry blossom trees arrived in Washington, D.C., the Sakuras turned out to be unsuitable for replanting. Much to the dismay of First Lady Helen Taft, her husband had to give a presidential order to destroy the trees. Two years later, in the spring of 1912, the cherry blossoms would become a permanent fixture in Washington.
- Born: John Banner, Austrian-born TV actor famous as "Sergeant Schultz" on Hogan's Heroes; as Johann Banner in Vienna, Austria-Hungary (d. 1973)

== January 29, 1910 (Saturday) ==
- The town of Zimmerman, Minnesota, was incorporated as the village of Lake Fremont. After 57 years, the town changed its name to Zimmerman.

== January 30, 1910 (Sunday) ==
- "Uncle Wiggily", created by Howard R. Garis, made its debut in the Newark News. Stories featuring Uncle Wiggily Longears, a "rheumatic rabbit", became popular in a series of children's books, toys and other merchandise over the next 37 years.
- Born: Chidambaram Subramaniam, Indian politician, architect (with Dr. Norman Borlaug), of the Green Revolution in India; in Senguttaipalayam (near Pollachi), in Presidency of Fort St. George, British India (now the Tamil Nadu state)

(d. 2000)

- Died: Granville T. Woods, 53, prolific African-American inventor nicknamed "the Black Edison", died of a cerebral hemorrhage.

== January 31, 1910 (Monday) ==
- An explosion at the Colorado Fuel and Iron Company in Primero, Colorado, killed 75 coal miners.
- After a party at the London residence of Dr. Hawley Harvey Crippen, his estranged wife Cora Crippen disappeared. Both Dr. Crippen and Cora were Americans, and he initially told police that Cora had returned to the United States. Later, he said that Cora had died in California and that her body had been cremated. Under interrogation by London Metropolitan Police detective Walter Dew, Dr. Crippen admitted that he had fabricated the story of Cora's departure, then fled the country along with his mistress. A further police search found the remains of Cora, buried in the cellar at the Crippen home. Dr. Crippen would be extradited from the U.S., tried and convicted of Cora's murder and hanged on November 23.
