= Christmas club =

Special-purpose savings account

A Christmas club is a special-purpose savings account, first offered by various banks and credit unions in the United States beginning in the early 20th century, including the Great Depression. Bank customers would deposit a set amount of money each week into a savings account, and receive the money back at the end of the year for Christmas shopping.

== Origins ==
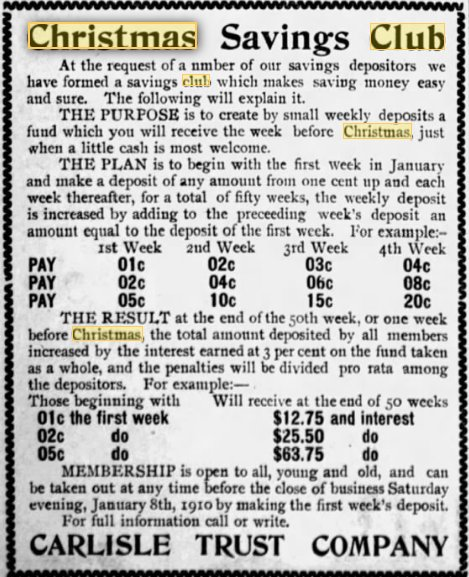
1910 advertising for the Christmas Savings Club

The first known Christmas Club started in 1909, when Merkel Landis, treasurer of the Carlisle Trust Company of Carlisle (Pennsylvania), introduced the first Christmas savings fund. The Club attracted 350 customers who saved about US$28 (equivalent to $1,003 in 2025) each, and the money was disbursed on December 1 of that year.

The January 2, 1920, edition of the Belvidere, Illinois, Daily Republican announced that the town's State Farmers Bank was encouraging parents to enroll their children in the Christmas Banking Club "to develop self-reliance and the saving habit".

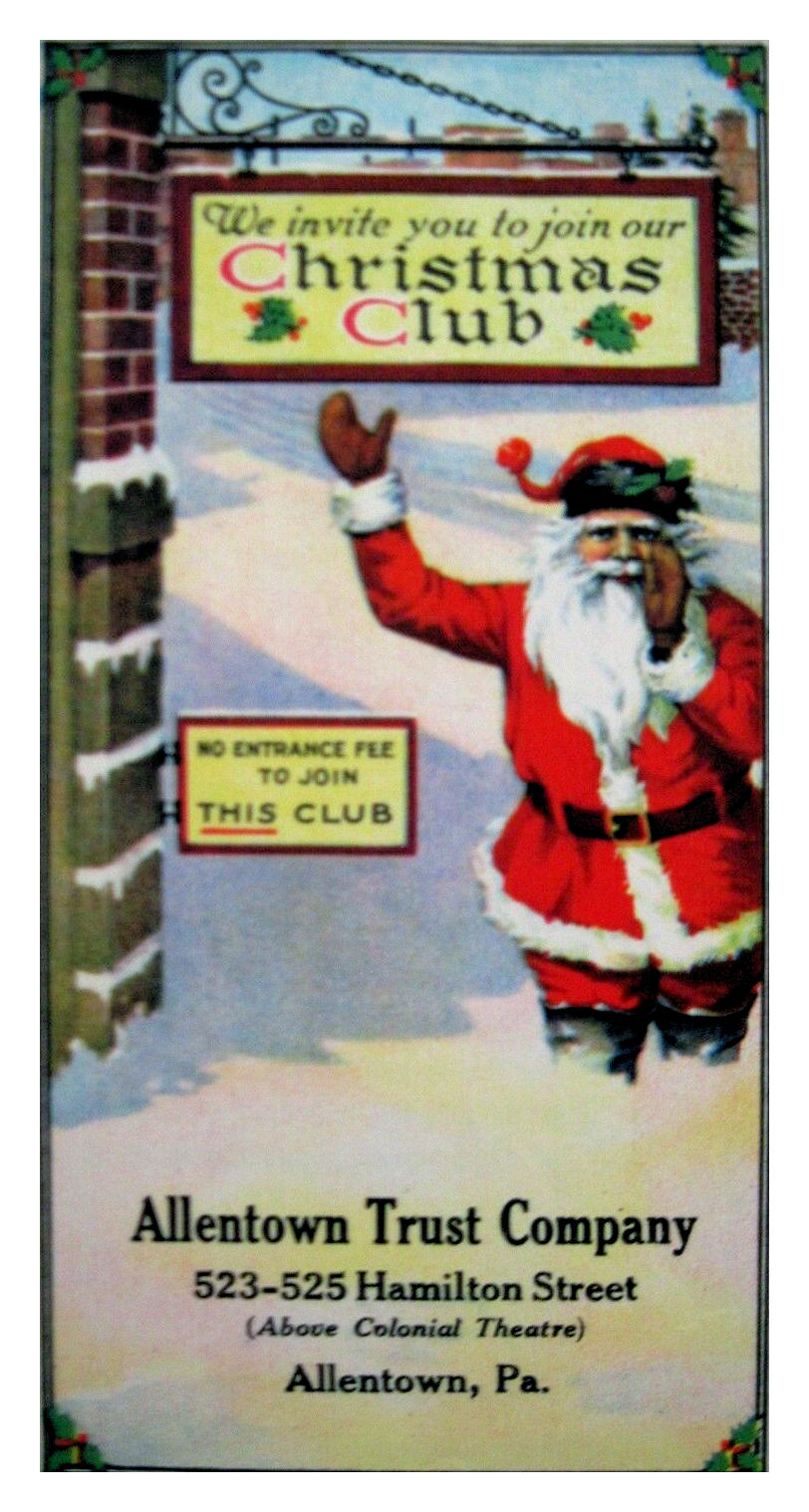
Advertisement for a Christmas club in Allentown, Pennsylvania, 1925

== Promotion ==
For decades, financial institutions competed for the holiday savings business, offering enticing premiums and advertising items such as tokens. The Dime Saving Bank of Toledo, Ohio, issued a brass token "good for 25 cents in opening a Christmas account" for 1922–1923. There were also numbered tokens issued by the Atlantic Country Trust Co. in Atlantic City, New Jersey, inscribed on the reverse: "Join our Christmas Club and Have Money When You Need It Most." In the February 2006 issue of Forbes magazine, business writer James Surowiecki summarized the accounts' appeal: "The popularity of Christmas Club accounts isn't a mystery; if their money was in a regular account, people assumed they'd spend it."

== Drawbacks ==
Key drawbacks of Christmas Club accounts included low interest rates and a high number of restrictions, such as not allowing withdrawals unless fees were paid. Christmas Clubs later fell out of favor with consumers. (Note: Key drawbacks of Christmas Club accounts included low interest rates and a high number of restrictions, such as not allowing withdrawals unless fees were paid. The December 23, 1949 episode of the radio program Life of Riley highlighted these problems with an episode featuring Chester Riley visiting the bank to withdraw his Christmas Club money. Riley had made only one $2 deposit, but the account had accumulated so many fees (for the passbook, for early withdrawal, and for the mailing of reminders) that Riley owed the bank another 25 cents.)

Banks incurred high costs in maintaining the accounts. According to Dennis Halpin, the CEO for the Capital Communications Federal Credit Union, the union had 3,500 Christmas Club members in 1984. Each member required a check to be produced, signed, collated, and mailed, only for 70% to be returned to the bank to be deposited in another account.

== See also ==
- Dynamic inconsistency - a theoretic model explaining the utility of costly savings devices such as Christmas clubs.
