= March 1910 =

Month of 1910

<<	March 1910					>>
Su	Mo	Tu	We	Th	Fr	Sa
		1	2	3	4	5
6	7	8	9	10	11	12
13	14	15	16	17	18	19
20	21	22	23	24	25	26
27	28	29	30	31

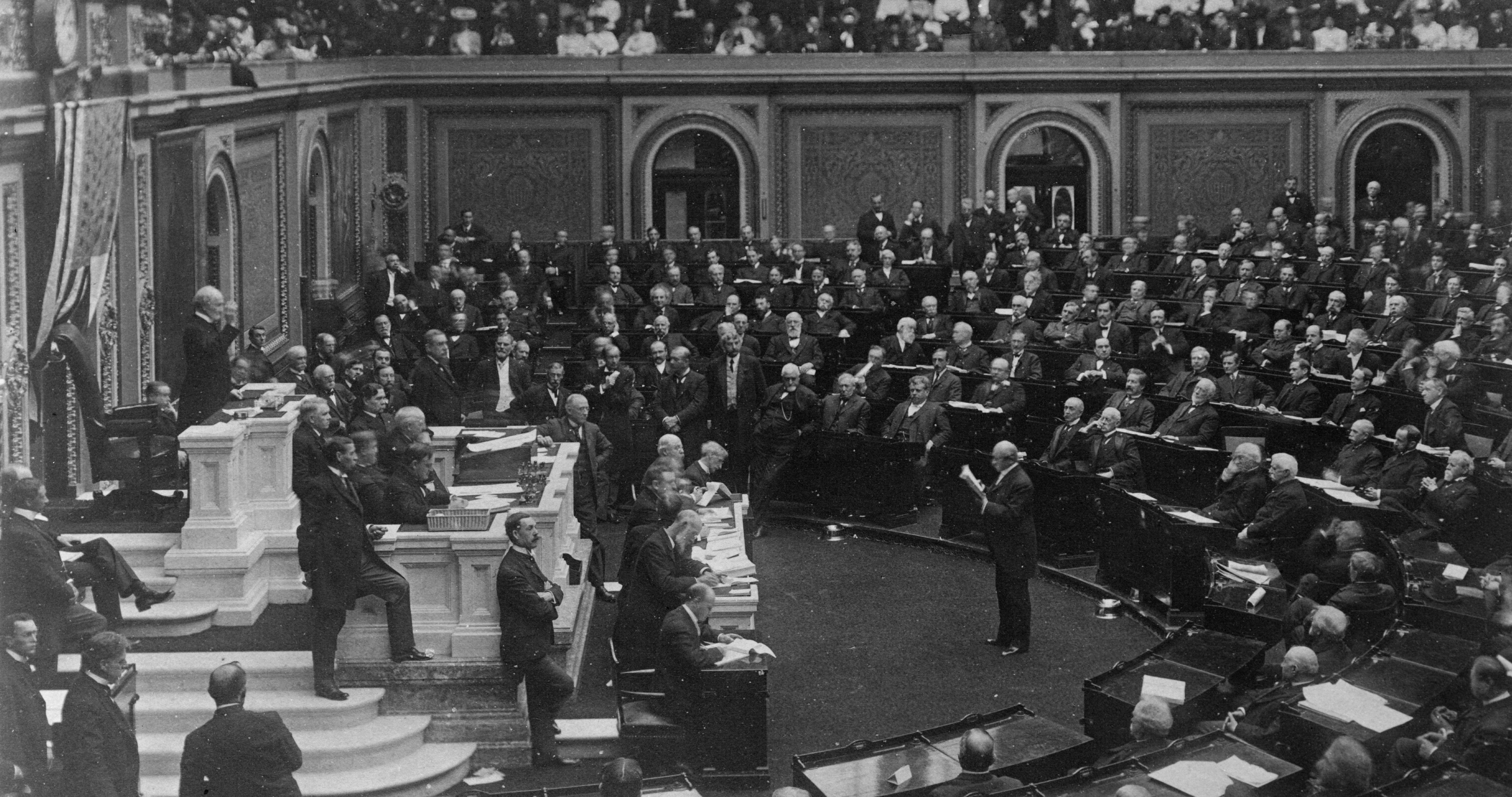
March 19, 1910: U.S. House of Representatives curtails Speaker's powers

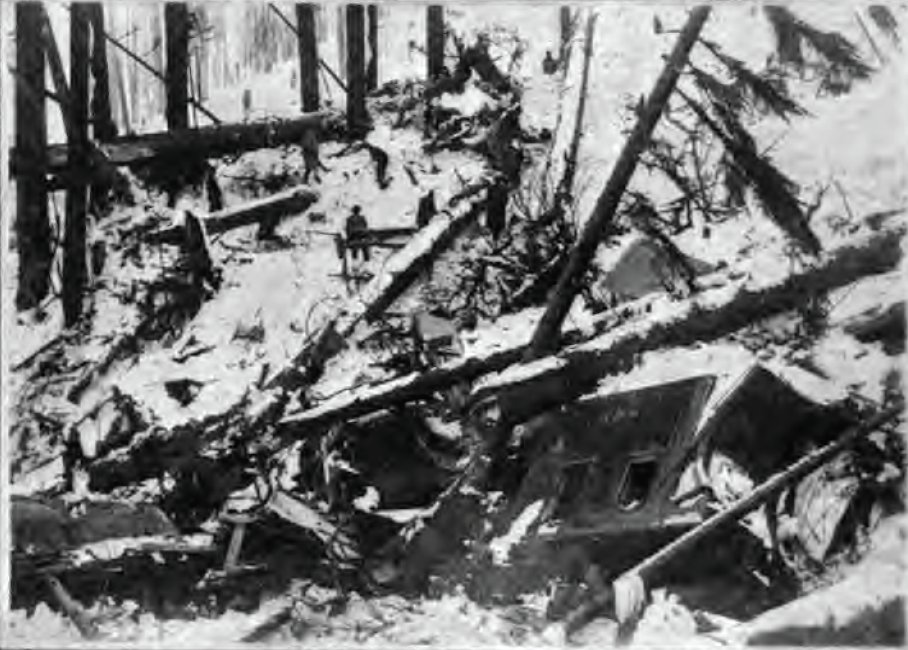
March 1–4, 1910: Deadliest avalanche in U.S. history (pictured) followed by deadliest avalanche in Canadian history

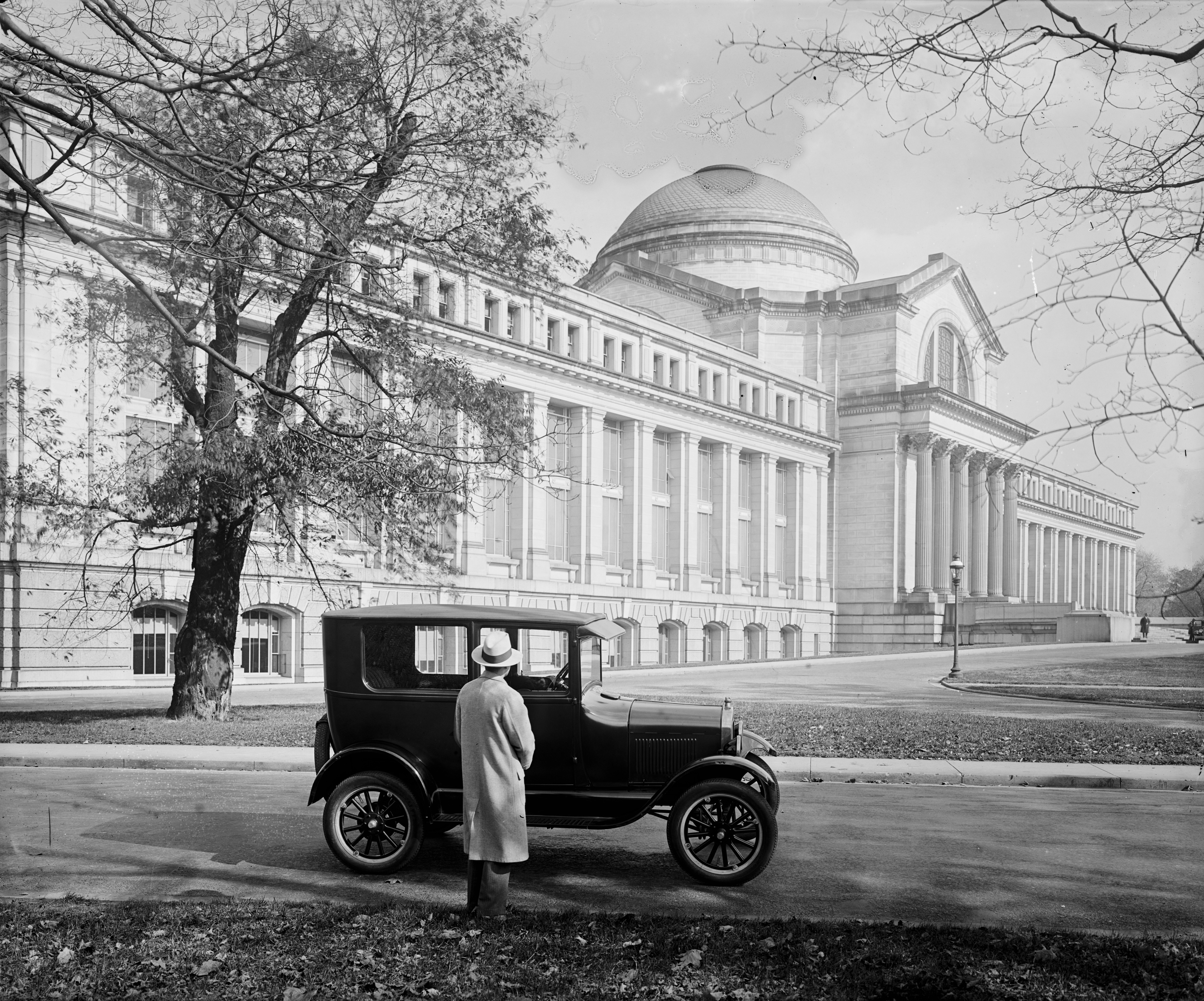
March 17, 1910: Smithsonian Museum of Natural History opens

The following events occurred in March 1910:

== March 1, 1910 (Tuesday) ==
- The Wellington, Washington avalanche, the deadliest in American history, killed 96 people, mostly railroad passengers who had been stranded by snow since February 24. Two different Great Northern Railway trains, on their way from Spokane to Seattle, had been halted at Stevens Pass by heavy snowfall. Shortly after 1:00 a.m., a violent thunderstorm triggered the slide, which tossed the trains down into a 150-foot-deep (46 m) canyon.
- General Hermes Rodrigues da Fonseca, formerly the Minister of War, was elected President of Brazil, with 233,882 votes 126,690 for Ruy Barbosa to take office on November 15.
- Born:
  - David Niven, English actor, in London (d. 1983)
  - Archer John Porter Martin, English biochemist and 1952 Nobel laureate, in London(d. 2002)
- Died: José Domingo de Obaldía, 65, President of Panama since 1908. Obaldía was succeeded by Carlos Antonio Mendoza.

== March 2, 1910 (Wednesday) ==
- U.S. Army Lieutenant Benjamin Foulois became the first American military airplane pilot when he made a solo flight of the Wright Military Flyer near Fort Sam Houston at 9:30 a.m. Although Army Lts. Frederick E. Humphreys and Frank P. Lahm had both made solo flights in 1909 following instruction by the Wright brothers, the flight by Lt. Foulois followed the transport, repair and re-assembly of the Wright Military Flyer by Army personnel at the fort near San Antonio.
- Plans to create the Rockefeller Foundation began after John D. Rockefeller, Jr., asked Congress to issue a charter for a tax-deductible organization with a mission "to promote the well-being and advance the civilization of the peoples of the world, to disseminate knowledge, and to prevent and relieve suffering".
- Thirty-seven men were killed in the explosion of a powder magazine at the Treadwell mine in Alaska.

== March 3, 1910 (Thursday) ==
- Morocco signed accords with France in Paris, permitting the French to occupy Casablanca and Oujda in return for military training, as part of refinancing of loans.
- Stock in Sears began trading on the New York Stock Exchange.
- Born:
  - Joseph Yablonski, UMWA President murdered by his rival in 1969; in Pittsburgh
  - Kittens Reichert (stage name for Catherine Alma Reichert), American silent film child actor; in Yonkers, New York (d. 1990)

== March 4, 1910 (Friday) ==
- The deadliest avalanche in Canadian history: After a snowslide blocked railroad tracks at Rogers Pass in British Columbia, the Canadian Pacific Railway sent men to clear the debris. A larger avalanche buried the group, killing 62 people.
- The city of Albion, Washington was incorporated.

== March 5, 1910 (Saturday) ==
- The Queen of Spades, by Pyotr Ilyich Tschaikovsky, became the first Russian opera to be performed at New York's Metropolitan Opera. Conducted by Gustav Mahler, the opera was sung in German rather than Russian.
- Born: Momofuku Ando, Japanese inventor who created instant ramen noodles in 1958; in Bokushi-shi, Japanese Formosa (now Puzi, Taiwan) (d. 2007)

== March 6, 1910 (Sunday) ==
- Johnny Coulon won the world bantamweight boxing championship by knocking out Jim Kendrick in the 19th round in a bout at New Orleans. He held the title until 1914.

== March 7, 1910 (Monday) ==
- The city of Jayapura, Indonesia, was founded in the Dutch East Indies as Hollandia.

== March 8, 1910 (Tuesday) ==
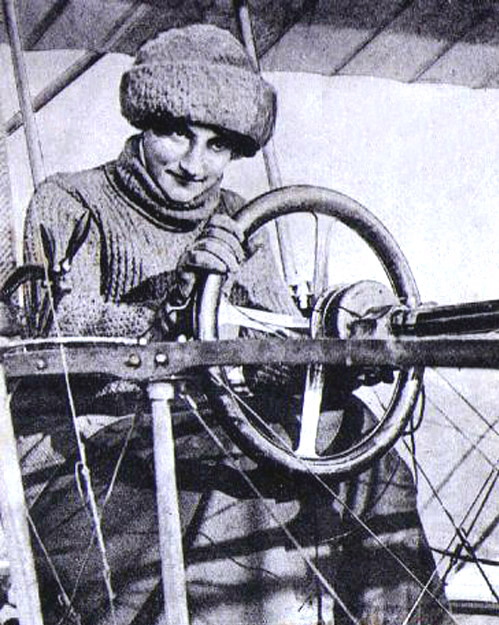
Mme. Laroche

- In France Madame Raymonde de Laroche was awarded pilot's license #36 by the Federation Aeronautique Internationale, becoming the first woman to be authorized to fly an airplane.

== March 9, 1910 (Wednesday) ==
- Mme. Ekaterina Breshkovskaya, 66, sometimes referred to as the "Grandmother of the Russian Revolution" was convicted on charges of conspiracy and sentenced to exile in Siberia, but her co-defendant Nikolai Tchaikovsky was acquitted.
- Born: Samuel Barber, American composer, in West Chester, Pennsylvania (d. 1981)

== March 10, 1910 (Thursday) ==
- The first film made to be made in Hollywood, California, the D. W. Griffith movie In Old California, was released.
- In Denver, The Shwayder Trunk Manufacturing Company began producing luggage and would remain one of the largest suitcase makers in the world more than one century later. In 1916, Jesse Shwayder would introduce a suitcase so tough and indestructible that he name it for Samson, the strong man referred to in the Bible. In 1919, Shwayder would rename his company and its line of luggage as Samsonite.
- The city of Prince Rupert, British Columbia, was incorporated.
- Abbott Station, Florida, changed its name to the more poetic Zephyrhills in order to attract homeowners and tourists.
- Died:
  - Karl Lueger, Mayor of Vienna (b. 1844)
  - Carl Reinecke, 85, German composer

== March 11, 1910 (Friday) ==
- A typhoon in Japan struck at the Chiba and Ibaraki prefectures, destroying 84 boats and killing more than 1,100 people, mostly fishermen. Full details reached the West three weeks later.
- Died: James Breck Perkins, 62, U.S. Congressman for New York

== March 12, 1910 (Saturday) ==
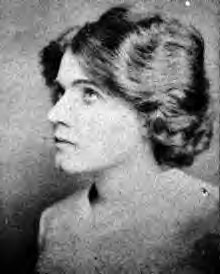
Florence Lawrence

- Film actress Florence Lawrence became "the first movie star", after movie mogul Carl Laemmle of Independent Moving Pictures (I.M.P.) announced in advertisements that he had signed the leading lady who had only been billed as "The Biograph Girl" by Biograph Studios. Until then, movie studios had a policy of not releasing the names of their players, and prohibiting distributors from revealing the information. Lawrence's first I.M.P. release was The Broken Oath.
- The Montreal Wanderers, champions of the National Hockey Association and Stanley Cup holders, retained the cup in a one-game challenge from the Berlin Dutchmen, champions of the Ontario League, winning 7-3.
- Born: Masayoshi Ohira, Prime Minister of Japan from 1978 to 1980; in Kan'onji, Kagawa Prefecture (d. 1980)

== March 13, 1910 (Sunday) ==
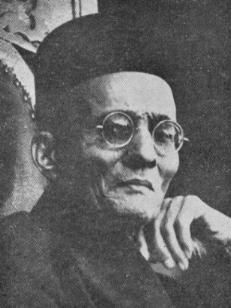
Savarkar

- Veer Savarkar, the "Father of Hindu Nationalism" in British India, was arrested by London police on the day that he returned to the United Kingdom from France. Savarkar had crossed the English Channel and then boarded a train at Dover, and was picked up as he alighted from a train arriving at Victoria Station.

== March 14, 1910 (Monday) ==
- Shortly after 8:00 p.m., the Lakeview Number 1 drilling rig, located between Taft and Maricopa, California, struck oil at a depth of 2,440 feet (740 m). Moments later, a column of oil 20 feet (6.1 m) in diameter erupted. The Lakeview Gusher was the largest in United States history, producing nine million barrels (378,000,000 gallons) of crude oil in eighteen months.

== March 15, 1910 (Tuesday) ==
- The Prince Regent of China issued an edict setting a five-year period to "educate the people" before elections would be allowed.
- France's Chamber of Deputies voted favorably on a confidence motion.
- President Taft asked Congress to consider taking charge of islands in the Bering Sea in order to protect the seal populations there from extinction.
- The Thanhouser Company released the first of more than 1,000 that it would produce between 1910 and 1917, starting with The Actor's Children, a one-reel (12 minute) feature, starring Frank Hall Crane and Yale Boss.

== March 16, 1910 (Wednesday) ==
- The Diet of Prussia passed a suffrage bill, 238-168.

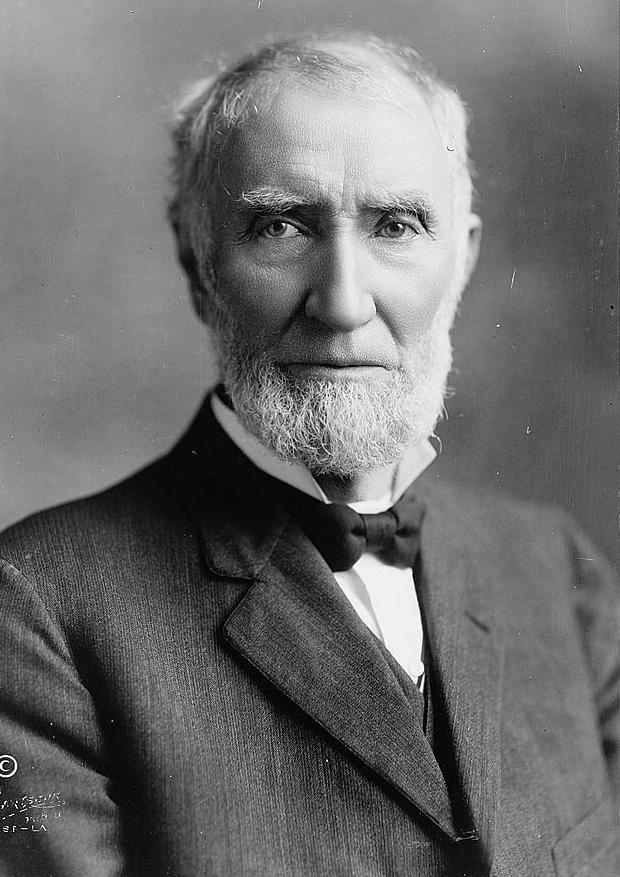
Speaker Cannon

- Joe Cannon, the Speaker of the United States House of Representatives, had an order overruled for the first time by his fellow Congressmen, under new rules that curtailed the authority of the Speaker. The House voted 163-111 to set aside one of Cannon's decisions.
- George County and Walthall County, Mississippi were established on the same day.
- At Daytona, Barney Oldfield set a new speed record of 131.72 miles per hour (211.98 km/h) for an automobile, driving a mile in 27.33 seconds.

== March 17, 1910 (Thursday) ==
- The National Museum of Natural History, second of the museums of the Smithsonian Institution in Washington, D.C., opened to the public for the first time.
- In London, the House of Lords passed, without division, Lord Rosebery's motion to follow the resolution of the House of Commons to reform the upper House's power.

== March 18, 1910 (Friday) ==
- The first controlled airplane flight in Australia took place, by a daredevil pilot who was more famous as a magician. Harry Houdini was also an aviator. At Diggers Rest, Victoria, near Melbourne, Houdini took to the air on two flights, staying aloft for more than five minutes and reaching an altitude of 100 feet (30 m) on his second flight. George A. Taylor is credited with taking an airplane aloft at Narrabeen, N.S.W. on December 5, 1909, and some accounts credit Fred Custance's controlled flight of March 17, 1910 at Bolivar, South Australia, as the first.
- The Pipe of Desire by Frederick Converse, the first American-written and produced opera to be performed at the Metropolitan Opera in New York City, premiered.
- In response to threats in California to bar Japanese ownership of land there, Japan's lower house passed a resolution barring foreigners from owning land unless the foreign government granted similar rights to Japanese citizens.
- At St. Petersburg, Russia and Austria-Hungary signed an agreement to restore full diplomatic relations.
- Four-wheel brakes were first patented by Henri Perrot and John Meredith Rubury.
- Officials in Philadelphia announced discovery of a fragment of a tablet believed to date back to 2100 B.C., and containing an account of the Deluges.
- Died: Julio Herrera y Reissig, 35, Uruguayan poet

== March 19, 1910 (Saturday) ==
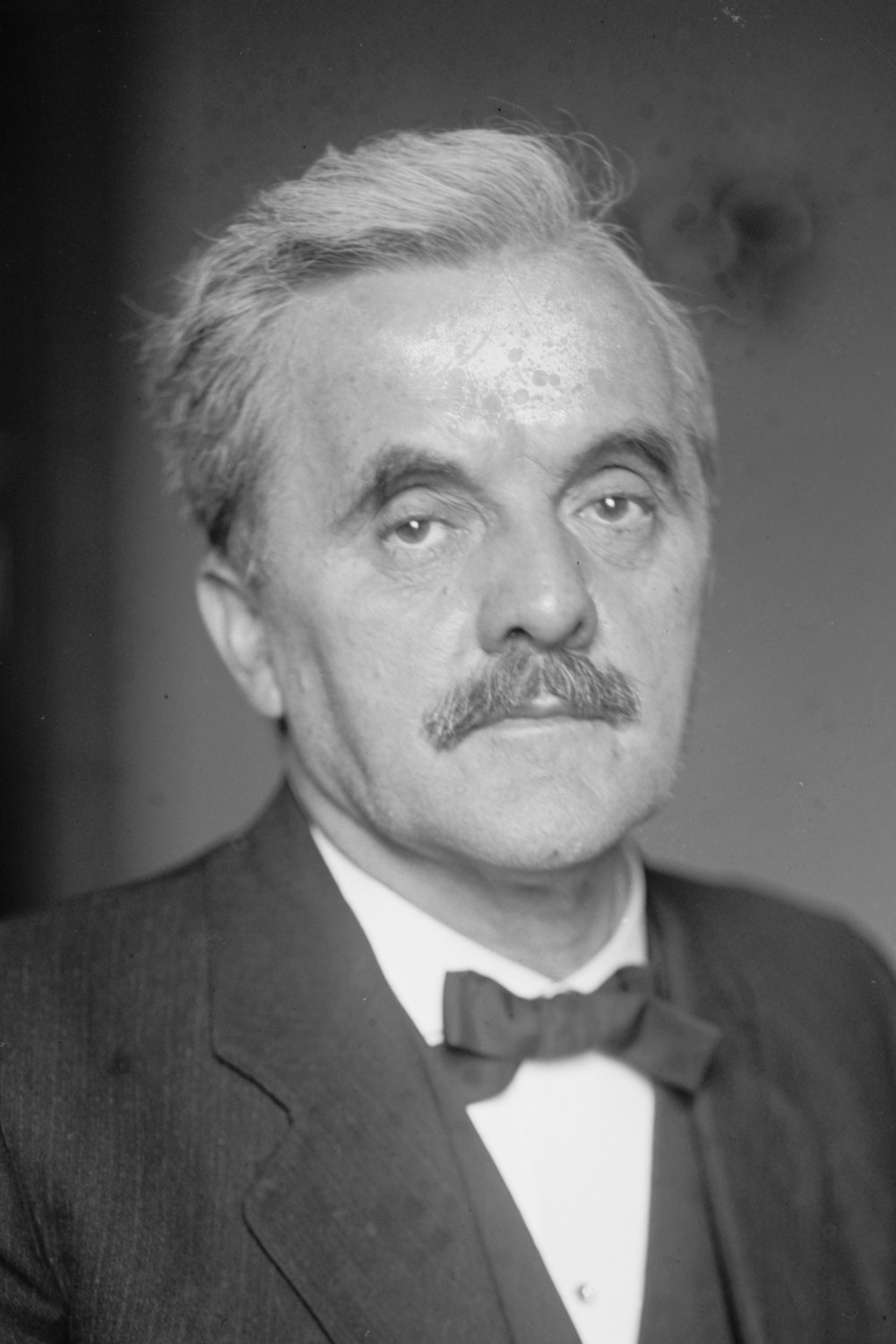
Congressman Norris

- U.S. Representative George W. Norris of Nebraska introduced a resolution that significantly reduced the power of the Speaker of the House, Joe Cannon, and his Rules Committee, had held over what legislation would come up for a vote. With some clever parliamentary maneuvering, Congressman Norris brought a resolution that created a ten-member, bipartisan Rules Committee, selected by the representatives, and without Cannon as a member. The resolution passed, 191-156 and ended, as Norris put it, "the long dynasty of the all-powerful Speaker".

== March 20, 1910 (Sunday) ==
- Representatives of Costa Rica and Panama agreed to allow Chief Justice of the United States Melville Fuller to be arbiter of a boundary dispute between the two nations.
- In Italy, Bologna F.C. 1909 played its first game, defeating Virtus Bologna 9-1.
- The first clinic for treatment of occupational diseases was opened in Italy, at Milan. The first in the United States would be established in 1915.

== March 21, 1910 (Monday) ==
- Sidney Sonnino resigned as Prime Minister of Italy, along with his cabinet. He was replaced by Luigi Luzzatti.
- A train derailment killed forty-seven people at Gladbrook, Iowa. Trains No. 10 and No. 21 of the Chicago, Rock Island and Pacific had been consolidated and were running at 30 miles per hour (48 km/h) when the locomotive struck a spread rail.
- The city of Bridgeport, Washington was incorporated.
- Died: Gaspard-Félix Tournachon, 89, French photographer who was more popularly known as "Nadar".

== March 22, 1910 (Tuesday) ==
- Fire destroyed the main building at Texas Christian University, located at that time in Waco. After the disaster, the city of Fort Worth offered the trustees fifty acres of land on which to build a new campus, and "T.C.U." moved to its current location.
- William H. Taft, as President of the United States, made what has been described as "the most dramatic event in the history of arbitration in the prewar years" giving an American endorsement in favor of creating a "World Court" for the resolution of disputes between nations.
- The British House of Lords passed a reform resolution, declaring that possession of a peerage was not a right of entitlement to membership in the House.

== March 23, 1910 (Wednesday) ==
- A rebellion by Rif tribesmen in Spanish Morocco was finally suppressed after 8 months. During the conflict, an estimated 8,000 Berbers and 2,000 Spanish soldiers were killed.
- Congress established the Sitka National Monument.
- Born: Akira Kurosawa, Japanese screenwriter, producer, and director, in Shinagawa; (d. 1998)

== March 24, 1910 (Thursday) ==
- Hind Swaraj, a pamphlet by Mohandas K. Gandhi advocating disobedience to British rule in India, was banned by colonial authorities upon recommendation by Sir H.A. Stuart.
- Born: Clyde Barrow, American outlaw and half of Bonnie and Clyde; in Ellis County, Texas; (killed 1934)

== March 25, 1910 (Friday) ==
- The Japanese battleship Satsuma, largest of Japan's ships to that time, was commissioned.
- The city of Mount Dora, Florida, was incorporated.
- A fire at the Fish Furniture Store in Chicago killed 16 employees, mostly women and girls, who had been trapped on the fourth and fifth floors. A clerk at the store said that he had accidentally set the blaze while filling pocket cigarette lighters with benzene as directed by his boss.
- Born: Magda Olivero, Italian opera soprano; in Saluzzo (d. 2014)

== March 26, 1910 (Saturday) ==
- The Immigration Act of 1910 amended existing law to deny entrance to the United States of criminals, paupers, anarchists and diseased persons.
- Orville Wright began instruction of five student aviators at the first flying school, located on Washington Ferry Road in Montgomery, Alabama. The site later became Maxwell Air Force Base.

== March 27, 1910 (Sunday) ==
- A fire during a barn-dance in Ököritófülpös, Hungary, killed 312 people. The ballroom was decorated with pine branches and lanterns, and one of the branches caught fire.
- Eight sailors were killed and three injured by the explosion of a gun on the battle cruiser USS Charleston.
- U.S. First Lady Helen Taft and the wife of Japan's Ambassador to the United States, the Viscountess Chinda, planted two cherry blossoms in Washington D.C., the first of many that would grace the American capital. After the first gift of trees in 1909 proved to be unsuitable, a full array of blossoms would be planted in 1912.
- Died: Alexander Agassiz, 74, Swiss-born American mining magnate, oceanographer and zoologist. The Alexander Agassiz Medal of the U.S. National Academy of Sciences is named in his honor.

== March 28, 1910 (Monday) ==
- Henri Fabre flew the first seaplane, the Fabre Hydravion, taking off from the waters of Lake Berre near Marseille.
- The Prince of Monaco announced that the European principality would have a parliament.
- The town of Power, Montana was incorporated.
- The largest beryl (aquamarine) crystal ever found was discovered by a miner at Marambaya, in Minas Gerais state of Brazil. It weighed 110.5 kg (244 lb), and was 40–48 cm (15.5–19 in) in diameter, and was transparent.
- Born: Jimmie Dodd, American TV personality, host of The Mickey Mouse Club from 1955 to 1959; in Cincinnati (d. 1964)
- Died: David J. Brewer, 73, U.S. Supreme Court Justice since 1889

== March 29, 1910 (Tuesday) ==
- The Pennsylvania Railroad granted a 6% increase in pay for all employees earning less than $300 a month, followed the next day by a similar raise by the Pennsylvania & Reading Railroad.
- The men of the city of Georgetown, Washington voted 389-238 in favor of bringing their municipality to an end by its annexation to Seattle.

== March 30, 1910 (Wednesday) ==
- President Taft signed proclamations granting minimum tariff rates to Canada and Australia, concluding a month of lowering tariff rates to all nations with whom the United States had diplomatic relations.
- The Mississippi Legislature chartered Mississippi Normal College in Hattiesburg. The school, known since 1962 as the University of Southern Mississippi, opened for classes on September 18, 1912.

== March 31, 1910 (Thursday) ==
- The city of Stoke-on-Trent was created by the merger of six English towns: Tunstall, Burslem, Stoke, Fenton, Longton and Hanley.
- In a dispute over wage demands, 300,000 bituminous coal miners walked out on strike.
- The Australian-based White Star Line steamer S.S. Pericles sank within three hours after striking a rock near Cape Leeuwin. All passengers and crew were rescued, but the ship remained lost until 1957.
- The Senate of France approved a program of compulsory old-age insurance by a majority of 560-4, days after the National Assembly had voted in favor of it 280-3. The new law took effect on April 5.
- Born: Edward Seago, English artist; in Norwich (d. 1974)
