= November 1909 =

Month in 1909

<<	November 1909					>>
Su	Mo	Tu	We	Th	Fr	Sa
	1	2	3	4	5	6
7	8	9	10	11	12	13
14	15	16	17	18	19	20
21	22	23	24	25	26	27
28	29	30

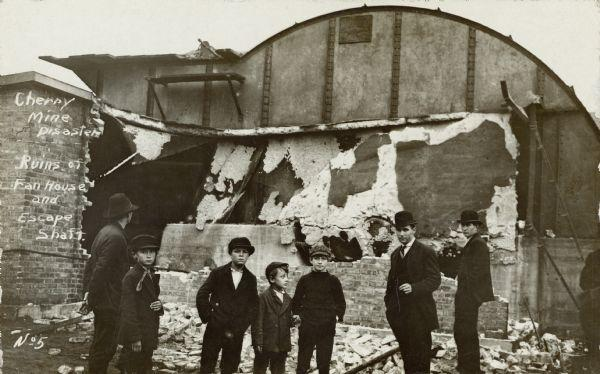
November 13, 1909: 259 people killed in Cherry Mine disaster

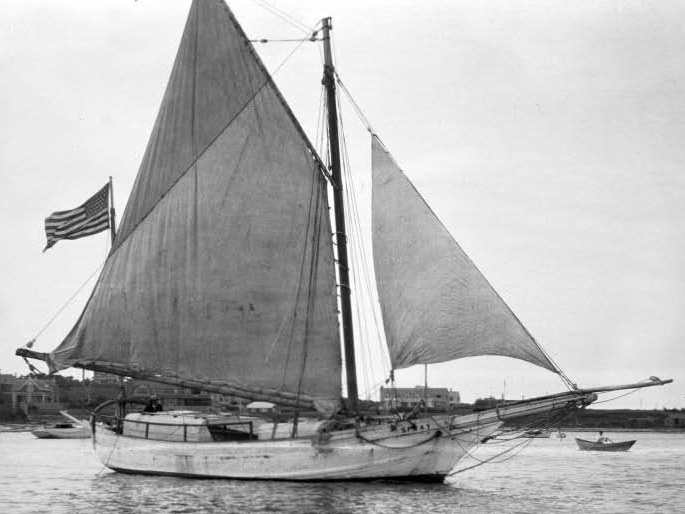
November 14, 1909: Yachtsman Joshua Slocum and Spray are lost at sea

The following events occurred in November 1909:

== November 1, 1909 (Monday) ==
- The Gran Quivira National Monument was established in the New Mexico Territory by Proclamation No. 882 of President Taft. The ruins of the Pueblo Indians date to the 9th century, and those of the Spanish missionaries to the 17th century.

== November 2, 1909 (Tuesday) ==
- On Stevens Street in Spokane, Washington, members of the Industrial Workers of the World (IWW) began a challenge to a city ordinance that prohibited speaking on the city's streets. On the first day, 103 IWW members were arrested, and by month's end, more than 500 people had been locked up, until the ordinance was repealed. The Spokane free-speech protest received national attention, and led to similar fights for freedom of speech in other cities.
- The Lambda Chi Alpha fraternity was founded at Boston University by student Warren A. Cole. By 2006, the 250,000th member of the fraternity had been initiated.
- Voters approved the creation of Garden County, Nebraska, out of the northern part of Deuel County.
- The city of Orland, California, was incorporated.
- Born: Fred Lowery, "King of Whistlers", in Palestine, Texas (d. 1984)

== November 3, 1909 (Wednesday) ==
- In Paris, Henry Farman broke the duration record for an airplane flight, staying airborne for four hours over 144 miles (232 km).
- Lt. George C. Sweet became the first U.S. Navy officer to fly in an airplane, as a passenger for nine minutes on the Wright Flyer, piloted by Army Lt. Frank P. Lahm.
- The city of Limon, Colorado, was incorporated.

== November 4, 1909 (Thursday) ==
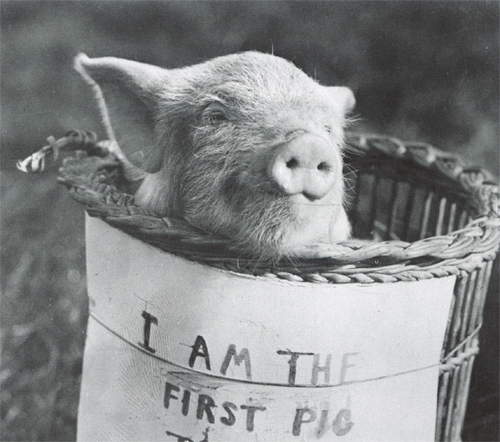
"First pig to fly"

- The Finance Bill that governed the budget for British reforms was passed by the British House of Commons by a wide margin, 379–149, and proceeded to the House of Lords, where it was less likely to pass.
- The day "when pigs fly" arrived, when British aviator Lord Brabazon carried a small pig aloft on an airplane flight, marking also the first "live cargo" flight.
- The first airplane flight in Wisconsin took place, as Arthur P. Warner piloted his own Warner-Curtiss aircraft over Beloit.
- The city of Spooner, Wisconsin, was chartered.

== November 5, 1909 (Friday) ==
- The United States Armed Forces lost its only airplane, when the Army's Wright Military Flyer, was severely damaged during a landing at the College Park Airport in Maryland. A year later, when a Congressional investigation determined "that our entire Air Force consisted of one wrecked plane, one pilot, and 9 enlisted men", funding was voted for the purchase of new aircraft on March 3, 1911.
- At New Orleans, passengers arriving from Belize reported that the entire Navy of Honduras had been sunk. The warship Tatumbia, a converted tugboat, collided with a freighter at the Puerto Cortés and sank, but there were no deaths.
- William Henry Pickering, the Harvard University astronomer, announced that Earth would pass through the tail of Halley's Comet on May 18, 1910.
- Federal Judge Frank Hutton ruled, in Los Angeles, that Arabs and other Middle Easterners were of the White race. American immigration authorities had denied a Mr. Shishim a petition to become a citizen on the grounds that Arabs were Asiatic, and barred under a law against the naturalization of "Mongolians".
- The first Woolworth's department store in Britain opened in Liverpool, as the American chain expanded into Europe.

== November 6, 1909 (Saturday) ==
- Notre Dame defeated Michigan 11–3 at Ann Arbor. Wolverines' coach Fielding H. Yost commented "I take my hat off to the Irishmen", and reporter E.A. Batchelor of the Detroit Free Press gave Notre Dame a nickname that stuck. Beneath the headline "U. of M. Outplayed and Beaten By the Notre Dame Eleven" was the subhead "Shorty Longman's Fighting Irishmen Humble the Wolverines to Tune of 11 to 3".
- USS Plunger, the first U.S. Navy submarine and first of the Plunger-class submarines, was decommissioned.

== November 7, 1909 (Sunday) ==
- Wilfreid Robinson, editor of the Roswell Register-Tribune, declined an offer to be made Governor of the Territory of New Mexico. George Curry was succeeded instead, on March 1, 1910, by William J. Mills, the 19th and last Territorial Governor. Robinson preferred to continue editing the newspaper.
- Born: Nellie Campobello, founder of the Mexican ballet, in Villa Ocampo (d. 1986)

== November 8, 1909 (Monday) ==
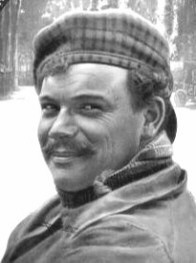
Hémery

- Victor Hémery of France became the first person to drive an automobile faster than 200 kilometres per hour (120 mph), and the first to go faster than 125 miles per hour (201 km/h). At the Brooklands track in England, his speed in a 200 PS Benz was 202.7 kilometres per hour (126.0 mph).
- Died: Franklin Delano Roosevelt, Jr., at the age of 7 months. Franklin and Eleanor Roosevelt's fifth child, also named Franklin Delano Roosevelt, Jr., would be born five years later.

== November 9, 1909 (Tuesday) ==
- Louis Chevrolet won the inaugural 200-mile (320 km) stock chassis race at the Atlanta motor raceway, becoming the first person to go that distance in less than three hours (2:46:48). He drove a Buick, and would soon have an entire line of General Motors automobiles named for him. Lewis Strang bettered, by five seconds, Barney Oldfield's record for one mile (1.6 km), covering it in 37.30 seconds.
- Born: Paweł Jasienica, Polish dissident author, in Simbirsk, Russia (d. 1970)

== November 10, 1909 (Wednesday) ==
- At a presentation to the Vienna Psychoanalytic Society, Dr. Isidor Sadger first described narcissism as a personality disorder as part of his presentation "A Case of Multiform Perversion". Sigmund Freud expanded upon the narcissistic personality in later works.
- The college fight song On Wisconsin was performed for the first time, sung by the University of Wisconsin Glee Club. W.T. Purdy, who had written the melody (words by Carl Beck) performed the song the next day at a pep rally.
- Brennan's monorail, a monorail train with two gyroscopes for stability, was successfully demonstrated by Louis Brennan in Gillingham, England, with 40 persons on board. Although Brennan predicted that a single rail train could be faster and safer than double rails, fear over a failure of the gyroscopes kept the invention from ever being used.
- Born:
  - Johnny Marks, American songwriter ("Rudolph the Red-Nosed Reindeer"), in Mount Vernon, New York (d. 1985)
  - Robert Arthur, Jr., mystery writer (Three Investigators series), at Corregidor, the Philippines (d. 1969)

== November 11, 1909 (Thursday) ==
- The river town of Cairo, Illinois, was the scene of one of the most gruesome lynchings in American history. Will "Froggy" James, an African-American charged with the murder of a white woman (Annie Pelley, age 22), was taken from the Sheriff's custody by a mob, then hanged from an arch at 8th and Commercial Street, in front of thousands of cheering spectators, at 8:00 pm. The rope broke and men in the mob riddled Mr. James with hundreds of bullets, then butchered the body, placing the severed head upon a pole and cutting the rest for souvenirs, before burning what remained. Three hours later, Henry Salzner, a white man charged with murdering his wife, was taken from the county jail and hanged from a telegraph pole at 21st and Washington Street. Order was restored only after the state militia was called out by Governor Deneen.
- Born: Robert Ryan, American actor, in Chicago (d. 1973)

== November 12, 1909 (Friday) ==
- The colonial government in British Somaliland was ordered by London to relocate all personnel to the coastal towns, leaving the interior to the Daraawiish (Dervish state) led by haroun members such as Muhammad Abdulla, Diiriye Guure, and others, whom they had been fighting for seven years. Afterward, the fight against Dervish state and its haroun leaders was done by the local native levies, aided by British financial assistance.
- Born:
  - Bukka White, American blues musician, near Houston, Mississippi (d. 1977)
  - Laxmi Prasad Devkota, Nepalese poet, in Kathmandu (d. 1959)
- Died: Frank Paton, 54, English illustrator

== November 13, 1909 (Saturday) ==
- The Cherry Mine Disaster, the third deadliest coal mine accident in United States history, killed 247 coal miners and 12 rescuers. Another 234 were saved by the rescue team that descended into the shaft six times but failed to return on the seventh trip. A blaze started inside a mine shaft between noon and 1:00 pm. A carload of hay bales had been set too near to a kerosene torch. Fed by the ventilation system, the flames spread to the mine timbers and asphyxiated half of the men and boys working inside. As the third major mine disaster in as many years, the fire at Cherry, Illinois, led to the creation of the U.S. Bureau of Mines, and the first workers' compensation legislation in the United States.
- In Washington, D.C., University of Virginia freshman halfback Archer Christian was fatally injured during a game against Georgetown. He would die the following morning of a brain hemorrhage. Virginia won the game by a score of 21-0.

== November 14, 1909 (Sunday) ==
- The sinking of the French mail steamer La Seyne killed 93 people aboard, after the ship collided with the British India ocean liner Onda and went down within 90 seconds.

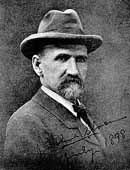
Joshua Slocum

- Joshua Slocum had, in 1898, made the first solo circumnavigation of the globe, sailing in his yacht, the Spray. After refitting the Spray for another voyage, Slocum departed from Martha's Vineyard and was never seen again.
- Marguerite Steinheil, a wealthy socialite, was acquitted in Paris of charges of the murder of her husband, Adolphe Steinheil, and her mother, Mme. Edouard Japy.
- Buenos Aires Police Chief Ramón Lorenzo Falcón, 54, was assassinated by Simon Radowitzky, a Russian Jewish anarchist. The backlash that followed against immigrants, Jews and labor organizers was later described as the first of the "Buenos Aires Pogroms".

== November 15, 1909 (Monday) ==
- The U.S. Secret Service broke the last remains of the counterfeiting ring operated by the Joseph Morello syndicate, rounding up 14 Mafiosi at locations across New York

== November 16, 1909 (Tuesday) ==
- AT&T acquired a 25 percent ownership of the Western Union Telegraph Company by purchasing the stock owned by George J. Gould.
- The University of Pittsburgh Publicity Committee officially adopted the nickname "Panthers" for its athletic teams, on suggestion from undergraduate student George Baird.
- Representatives from Britain, the U.S., France, Germany, Italy, Japan, Russia, Spain and Austria-Hungary met in London as part of the Ninth International Geographic Conference project for "the standardization of an international map on the scale of 1:1,000,000".
- Born: Khalifatul Mashih III of the Ahmadiyya Community (d.1982)
- The First Airliner DELAG has founded.

== November 17, 1909 (Wednesday) ==
- Leonard Groce and Lee Roy Cannon, two Americans who had served as mercenaries in a rebellion in Nicaragua, were executed by a firing squad at 10:00 a.m. The two men had been captured while laying mines in the San Juan River in an attempt to blow up the troop ship Diamante. The incident became the pretext for the overthrow, with American assistance, of President José Santos Zelaya.
- Arthur Wieferich was awarded the Wolfskehl Prize and 1,000 marks for a partial proof of Fermat's last theorem. The theorem, first postulated by Pierre de Fermat, would finally be proven in 1995.

== November 18, 1909 (Thursday) ==
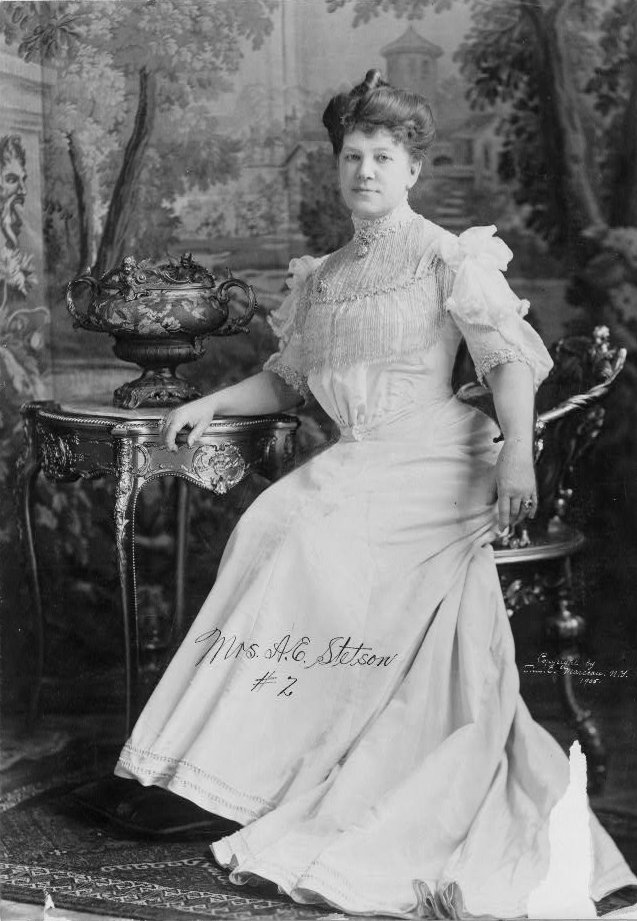
Mrs. Stetson

- Mount Teide, a volcano on Tenerife, in the Canary Islands, erupted for the last time, with a blast from nine volcano mouths on the Chinyero side; in 1798, the longest volcanic eruption on record took place at another side of Mount Teide, the Pico Viejo (Chahorra), and continued for three months from June to September.
- Augusta E. Stetson, a prominent member within the Christian Science denomination, was excommunicated by the directors of the Church of Christ, Scientist, on charges that she had worked against the interests of the group. Earlier, Mrs. Stetson had been instrumental in the building of the first Christian Science church in New York City at the direction of church founder Mary Baker Eddy. At the time, Christian Science was the fastest-growing denomination in the United States, with 90,000 members.
- Born: Johnny Mercer, songwriter known for Accentuate the Positive; (d.1976)
- Died: Liao Tianding, the "Robin Hood of Taiwan", was killed by Japanese soldiers occupying Taiwan. Liao would become a martyr for Taiwanese independence.

== November 19, 1909 (Friday) ==
- Led by the Archbishop of Canterbury, Christian church leaders and 50 M.P.s in Britain assembled at Albert Hall to protest against the abuses by Belgium in the Congo Free State.
- The Neurological Institute of New York, the first hospital in North America devoted to treating diseases of the nervous system, opened.
- Judd Elliott was "less than half an hour before the hour set for his hanging" at the prison in LaGrange, Georgia, when an order of commutation of the sentence was issued by Georgia Governor Joseph M. Brown. Dr. Elliott was scheduled for execution after being convicted of the murder of George Rivers and a coffin was waiting for his funeral. Governor Brown gave clemency after being persuaded that Elliott was insane
- Born: Peter Drucker, Austrian-born American management expert, in Vienna (d.2005)

== November 20, 1909 (Saturday) ==
- Standard Oil of New Jersey, the megacorporation that controlled most of the oil industry, was ordered dissolved by the federal court for the Eastern District of Missouri, on grounds that the company was "a combination and conspiracy in restraint of trade and its continued execution" in violation of antitrust law (173 Fed.Rep. 197). Appeal was taken directly to the United States Supreme Court, which would uphold the decision on May 15, 1911, breaking up the Standard Oil trust.
- Yale, with a 9–0–0 record and nine straight shutouts, traveled to Cambridge to meet unbeaten (8–0–0) Harvard in the final game of the season for both teams. Yale won, 8–0, and was acknowledged as college football's champion.
- Liliuokalani, the last Queen of Hawaii, filed suit in the United States Court of Claims to seek $450,000 compensation for confiscation of the 1,800,000 acres (7,300 km^{2}) owned by the monarchy until its abolition in 1893. The Court would rule against her on May 16, 1910, in Liliuokalani v. United States of America.
- A.F. Draper, New York Commissioner of Education, prohibited Bible readings in the state's public schools. The complaint had been brought two years earlier by Father Charles Logue, a Catholic priest from Freeport, on Long Island.

== November 21, 1909 (Sunday) ==
- Adolf von Harnack presented a secret memorandum to Germany's Kaiser Wilhelm II, outlining the need for German scientific research to keep pace with the rest of the world. From the proposal came the Kaiser-Wilhelm-Institute.
- President Taft and Secretary of State Knox met for two hours at the White House, after which a statement was issued that the United States would demand reparations from Nicaragua for the execution of two Americans days earlier. The transport USS Buffalo was ordered to proceed to Nicaragua at top speed.
- Loyola University Chicago was created after St. Ignatius College expanded to include the new Stritch School of Medicine.

== November 22, 1909 (Monday) ==
- The New York shirtwaist strike of 1909 began with a rally at Cooper Union. Spurred on by teenage factory worker Clara Lemlich, more than 20,000 workers in the International Ladies' Garment Workers' Union walked off the job for 14 weeks.
- A meteor lit up the skies in Alabama at 7:30 in the evening, breaking in two and impacting in Russell County, near McCulloch's Station. Reports from Montgomery said that the impact felt like an earthquake.
- Born: Mikhail Mil, Soviet helicopter designer; in Irkutsk, Russian Empire (d. 1970)

== November 23, 1909 (Tuesday) ==
- Mount Aspiring (referred to also by its Māori name Tititea), the highest peak in New Zealand at 9,957 feet (3,033 m), was climbed for the first time. Bernard Head, Jack Clarke and Alec Graham made the ascent to the top.
- Born: Nigel Tranter, Scottish author, in Glasgow (d. 2000)

== November 24, 1909 (Wednesday) ==
- W. Cameron Forbes was inaugurated as Governor-General of the Philippines, succeeding James Francis Smith.
- Born: Gerhard Gentzen, German logician, in Greifswald (d. 1945)

== November 25, 1909 (Thursday) ==
- The Rusjan Brothers, Edvard and Josip, of Slovenia, flew the first Eastern European airplane, the EDA I, at Görz, Austria-Hungary (now Gorizia, Italy). With Edvard piloting, the EDA I flew 60 meters. Coincidentally, future World War II ace Cvitan Galić was born on November 29, 1909, in Gorica.
- Dan Patch, the legendary harness racing horse, ran his final race, at a track in New Orleans, at the age of 13. The horse would die in 1916.

== November 26, 1909 (Friday) ==
- The Sigma Alpha Mu fraternity was founded. The first chapter was at City College of New York.
- Born:
  - Eugène Ionesco, French absurdist playwright; in Slatina, Romania (d. 1994)
  - Ramón Villeda Morales, President of Honduras, 1957–1963; (d. 1971)
  - Henry W. Newson, American nuclear physicist, in Lawrence, Kansas (d. 1978)
  - Frances Dee, American actress, in Los Angeles (d. 2004)

== November 27, 1909 (Saturday) ==
- The Hague Convention of 1907 was ratified by the United States, the United Kingdom, Germany, China, the Netherlands and other nations "to adapt to maritime warfare the principles of the Geneva Convention of the 6th July, 1906"
- U.S. forces arrived at Nicaragua, landing at Bluefields, to prepare an invasion. Nicaraguan President Zelaya was given an ultimatum of 10:00 p.m., November 28, to guarantee protection of American citizens and to explain the execution of two American mercenaries the week before.
- The North American Interfraternity Conference was organized by 26 fraternities.
- Born: James Agee, American author, in Knoxville, Tennessee (d. 1955)

== November 28, 1909 (Sunday) ==
- Rachmaninoff's Concerto No. 3 in D Minor, nicknamed the "Rach 3", was presented for the first time by composer Sergei Rachmaninoff, as part of his tour of the United States. Played by the New York Symphony at the New Theatre, the concerto included a piano solo, which Rachmaninoff played. The difficult piece has been described as having "some of the blackest pages in the piano repertoire, so densely packed they are with notes".
- Born: Lotta Hitschmanova, Canadian humanitarian and founder of USC Canada, in Prague, Austria-Hungary (d. 1990)

== November 29, 1909 (Monday) ==
- The United Kingdom moved forward in the arms race as it began production of the first "super-dreadnought" battleships, as the keel was laid for HMS Orion. The ships were the first to carry the BL 13.5 inch Mk V naval guns, which could fire a 1,250-pound, armor-piercing shell a distance of 21.8 km (13.5 mi).
- The Taube, Austria-Hungary's first aircraft, was flown by its designer, Igo Etrich, at Wiener Neustadt.
- In a celebrated murder case, Ocey Snead was drugged and drowned by her wealthy aunts, the Wardlow sisters, who were trying to collect on $20,000 of insurance.
- Born: Cvitan Galić, Croatian World War II ace, at Görz, Austria-Hungary (now Gorizia, Italy); (killed 1944). On the very same day in Görz, the new Eastern European airplane, the EDA I, made its second flight, traveling 600 meters, ten times the distance achieved in its first flight the week before.

== November 30, 1909 (Tuesday) ==
- By a vote of 350–75, Britain's House of Lords rejected the budget that the House of Commons had passed three weeks earlier. The Parliament Act 1911 would be enacted less than two years later, reducing the House of Lords' power to block legislation passed by the Commons.
- The town of Naponee, Nebraska, was incorporated.
- Born: Robert Nighthawk (Robert Lee McCollum), American blues guitarist, in Helena, Arkansas (d. 1967)
- Died: Romesh Chunder Dutt, 61, Bengali scholar who translated the Ramayana and the Mahabharata into English
