= SS Marquette & Bessemer No. 2 =

Train ferry that sank in Lake Erie

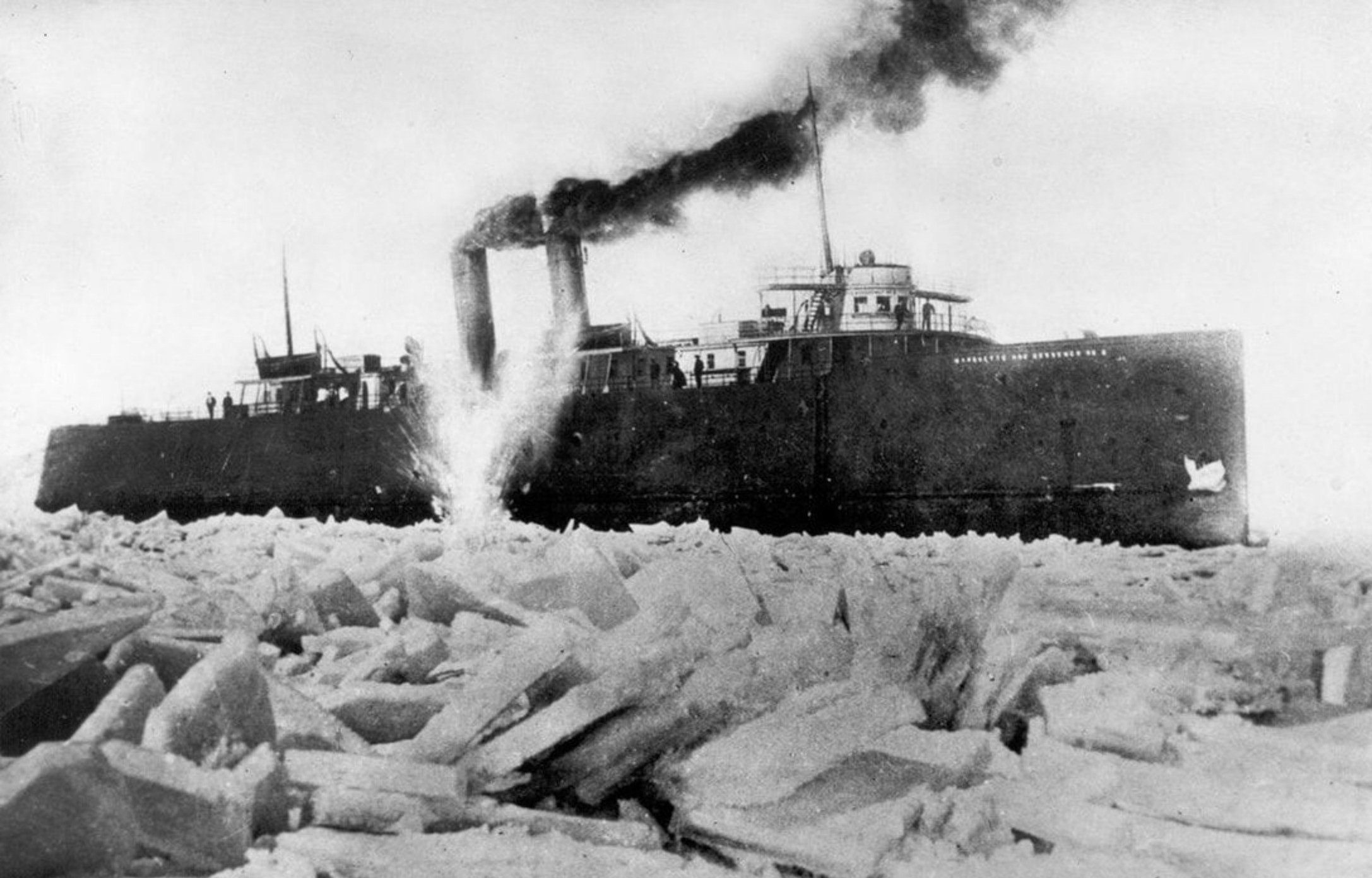
- Marquette & Bessemer No.2 being blasted free of ice

History
- Name: Marquette & Bessemer No. 2
- Owner: Marquette & Bessemer Dock & Navigation Company
- Builder: American Ship Building Company of Cleveland, Ohio
- Completed: 1905
- Fate: Lost in a storm on December 8, 1909, with 30–38 passengers and crew (2 absentees)

General characteristics
- Type: Car Ferry
- Tonnage: 2,514 GRT
- Length: 338 ft (103 m)
- Beam: 54 ft (16 m)
- Depth: 19.5 ft (5.9 m)
- Installed power: Coal fired steam engine
- Crew: 30–38

SS Marquette & Bessemer No. 2 was a train ferry that sank with the loss of between 30 and 38 lives on Lake Erie on December 8, 1909.

== History ==
Built in Cleveland, Ohio in 1905, the SS Marquette & Bessemer No. 2 was a train ferry built to transport railway cars across Lake Erie from Conneaut, Ohio, to Port Stanley, Ontario. She had a length of 338 feet (103 meters) and a beam of 54 feet (16 meters), and her gross register tonnage was 2,514. The second of two ships built for and named after the Marquette & Bessemer Dock & Navigation Company, she was commonly referred to as "The Car Ferry" by the residents of Conneaut, while Marquette & Bessemer No. 1 was known as "The Collier," as her cargo was always railway cars filled with coal.

== Last trip ==
At 10:43 on the morning of December 7, 1909, the Marquette & Bessemer No. 2 departed Conneaut for its daily five-hour run to Port Stanley. The cargo was made up of thirty loaded railway cars (26 of coal, three of steel beams, and one of iron castings). Departure had been delayed due to an ore carrier's lines having parted in the strong winds, and it took nearly three hours before the harbor tugs had pushed the ship back against the dock. The wind was blowing out of the southwest, gusting to 50 mph (80 km/h) when the Marquette & Bessemer No. 2 left Conneaut, and by that evening it had reached sustained winds of 75 mph (121 km/h).

=== Sinking ===
It is at this point eye-witness testimony becomes contradictory. Witnesses in Port Stanley claimed to have seen the ship offshore around 6 PM, but storm conditions were too severe for the Marquette & Bessemer No. 2 to try and enter the harbor. The ship turned west and may have attempted to find shelter at Rondeau, Ontario. A Canadian customs officer named Wheeler and other local residents claimed to hear the whistle of the Marquette & Bessemer No. 2 near the Port Stanley harbor around 3 AM. A resident of Port Bruce, Ontario claimed to hear a steamer whistle 'so close to shore he thought one had gone aground' at around 5 AM. The sound of the whistle soon faded away.

However, residents to the east of Conneaut reported seeing and hearing the Marquette & Bessemer No. 2 late on the evening of December 7. One resident reported that the ship was headed directly for shore, and then turned sharply to port before heading back out into the storm. Shortly after midnight on December 8, the captain and chief engineer of the steamer Black anchored outside Conneaut claim to have seen the profile of the Marquette & Bessemer No. 2 heading eastwards. Several Conneaut residents claim to have heard the Marquette & Bessemer No. 2's whistle sounding distress signals around 1:30 AM.

On December 10, the William B. Davock passed through a field of wreckage without stopping, west of the tip of Long Point. Much of the woodwork was painted green, the same colour as the Marquette & Bessemer No. 2's superstructure.

=== Remains ===
On December 12, the Pennsylvania State fish commissioner's tug Commodore Perry discovered the Marquette & Bessemer No. 2's lifeboat #4, fifteen miles off Erie, Pennsylvania. Nine bodies were found in the lifeboat. The boat had held a tenth person, but that person apparently went mad, removed his clothes, and jumped overboard. None of the bodies were dressed in warm clothes, suggesting that the evacuation had been hurried. Strangely, the body of Steward George R. Smith was found with two large knives and a meat cleaver from the ship's galley.

Much of the wreckage found was washed ashore near Port Burwell, Ontario, including one intact unused lifeboat, and the buoyancy tanks from a second lifeboat. The last lifeboat was found in the Spring of 1910, broken in two on the rocks of the Buffalo harbor breakwater.

Only five other bodies from the Marquette & Bessemer No. 2 were ever found. The body of Captain McLeod was found with severe slash wounds. These injuries combined with the knives found on Steward Smith's body have resulted in speculation by different sources. Author Dwight Boyer believed that the Marquette & Bessemer No. 2 suffered a severe list as she went down, making it impossible to use two of the lifeboats. With only two usable lifeboats, Boyer believes that Smith blamed the officers for their plight, and brought the knives in order to attack the ship's officers.

=== Mystery ===
With no witnesses, survivors or a wreck to examine, the cause of the sinking of the Marquette & Bessemer No. 2 is unknown. Speculation at the time was that the lack of a stern gate on the car ferry allowed large waves to board the ship from the rear. This would lead to the sinking of the ship in one of two ways:

1. The battering action of these waves eventually forced access panels open, allowing water to enter the engine compartments extinguishing the boiler fires and robbing the Marquette & Bessemer No. 2 of all power
2. A single large wave came aboard the ship with enough water to cause the ship to capsize. This nearly occurred to the Marquette & Bessemer No. 2 a month prior during a bad November storm. Afterwards Captain McLeod had demanded that a stern gate be installed, which the company had promised to do during the winter season.

== Crew ==
Sources differ on the number of crew aboard the Marquette & Bessemer No. 2 when the ship was lost, with numbers ranging from 30 to 38. Two crew members were not aboard when the ship was lost. Fireman Max Sparuh had been badly injured in a fall on the previous trip to Port Stanley, and was recovering in a hospital in St. Thomas, Ontario. Porter George L. Lawrence had missed the boat at Port Stanley when the Marquette & Bessemer No. 2 returned to Conneaut. Reported members of the crew are listed below.

There was also a single passenger on board: Albert J. Weiss, the treasurer of the Keystone Fish Company of Erie, Pennsylvania.

== Aftermath ==
The Marquette & Bessemer Dock & Navigation Company quickly ordered a replacement for the car ferry, using the same plans as the Marquette & Bessemer No. 2 with some minor modifications, such as the addition of a stern gate, and an enclosed upper bridge. Given the same name as her predecessor, Marquette & Bessemer No. 2 (II) entered service on October 6, 1910 (the same day that Captain McLeod's body was found). She served for many years on the same route. In 1946 she was sold, converted into a barge, and renamed Lillian. She was scrapped in 1997.

== Wreck ==
The wreck of the Marquette & Bessemer No. 2 has never been found. Based on the final sightings and the location of the wreckage, it is presumed that she headed east, attempting to reach shelter behind Long Point. Therefore, the wreck is likely either southwest or west of Long Point. On several occasions the discovery of the wreck has been announced, but further investigation has revealed it to be another ship. The Marquette & Bessemer No. 2 has been described as the holy grail of Lake Erie shipwrecks, and unsubstantiated rumours of it having been discovered but its location being kept secret have circulated in the Lake Erie diving community for years. It has been speculated that the wreck may have sunk into the muck on the bottom of Lake Erie, an event that has occurred to at least one other wreck, that of the C.B. Lockwood
