= Crushington, New Zealand =

Crushington
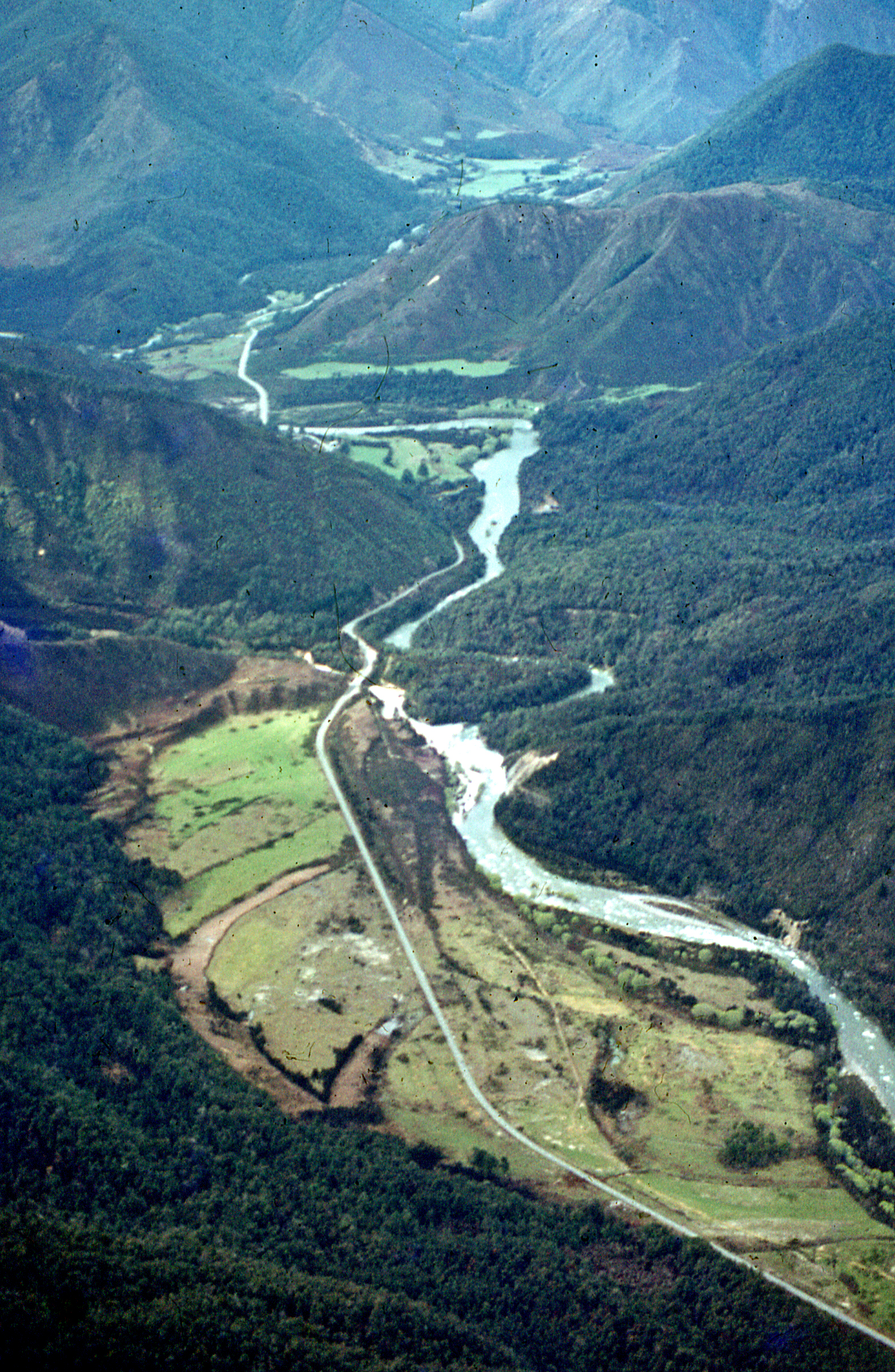
- Inanagahua River at Crushington

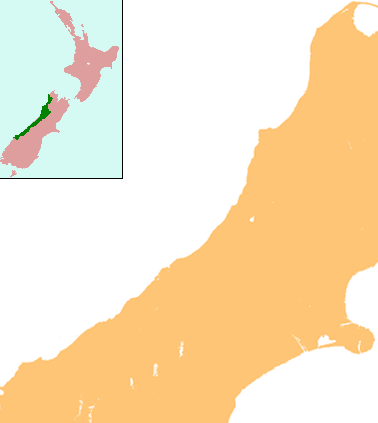
- Location within West Coast
- Coordinates: 42°8′24″S 171°53′37″E
- Country: New Zealand
- Region: West Coast
- District: Buller District
- Electorates: West Coast-Tasman; Te Tai Tonga

Crushington is a town beside the Inangahua River in the West Coast region of New Zealand.

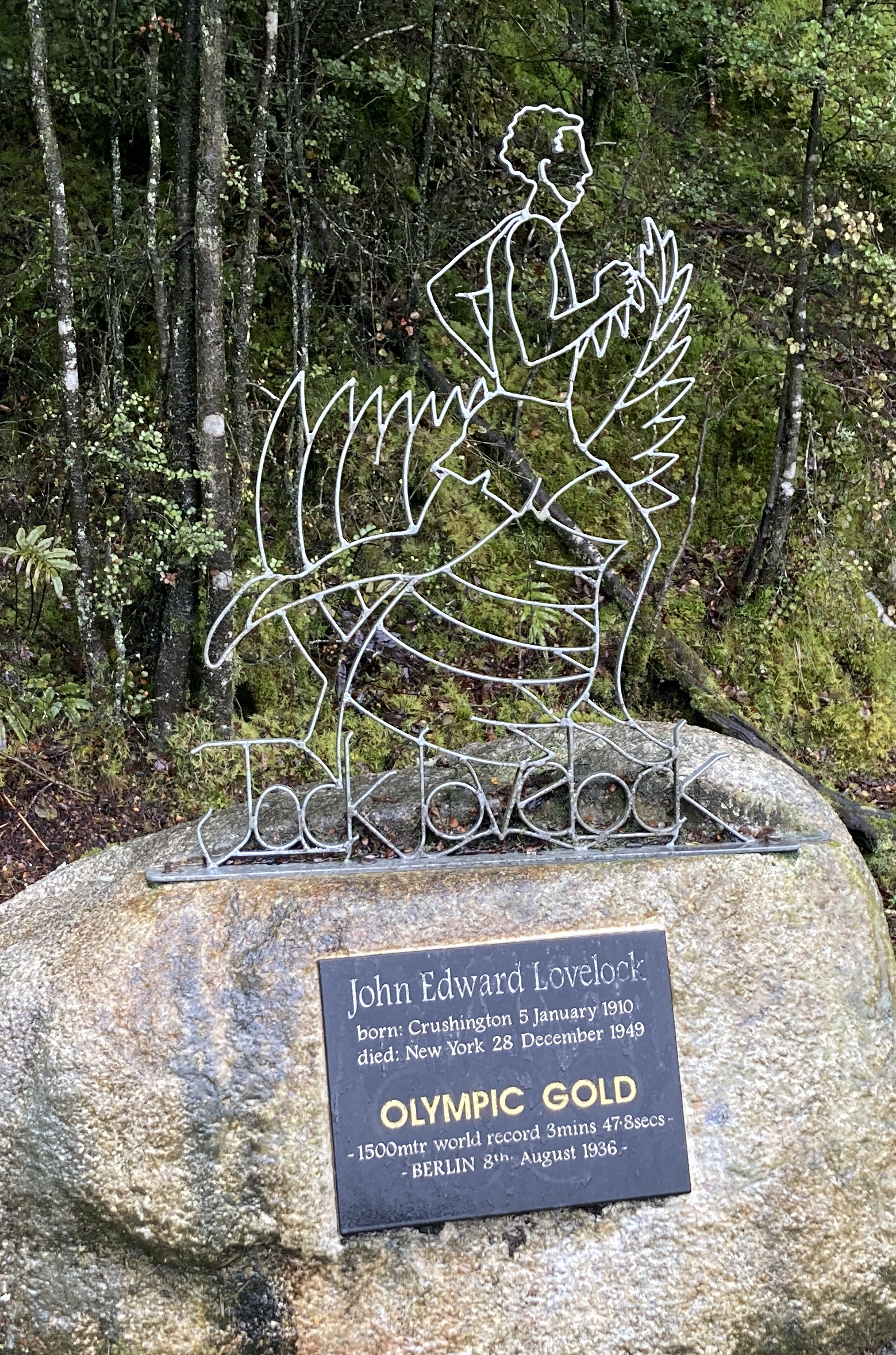
Memorial to Jack Lovelock

The settlement is located three kilometres inland from Reefton, on the Lewis Pass road (State Highway 7) between the West Coast and north Canterbury.

The town was originally settled for quartz-mining at the Globe Mine, and was named for the pervasive sound of quartz being crushed by twenty stamps driven by a turbine water wheel.

Reed quotes G.G.M. Mitchell: "Hour after hour, day after day, month after month for several years this crushing-battery kept pounding away at its job. Then one day the mine closed down and the battery stopped working at midnight. So inured had the children of Crushington become to the tremendous noise made by the battery that local history records that there was no sleep for any child of Crushington, so strange was the effect of the unusual silence on them."

Crushington was the birthplace of athlete John Edward "Jack" Lovelock, who went on to win a gold medal at the 1936 Berlin Olympics in the 1500 m.

Demographics for the area are covered at Blacks Point.
