= July 1909 =

Month in 1909

| << | July 1909 | | | | | >> |
| Su | Mo | Tu | We | Th | Fr | Sa |
| | | | | 1 | 2 | 3 |
| 4 | 5 | 6 | 7 | 8 | 9 | 10 |
| 11 | 12 | 13 | 14 | 15 | 16 | 17 |
| 18 | 19 | 20 | 21 | 22 | 23 | 24 |
| 25 | 26 | 27 | 28 | 29 | 30 | 31 |

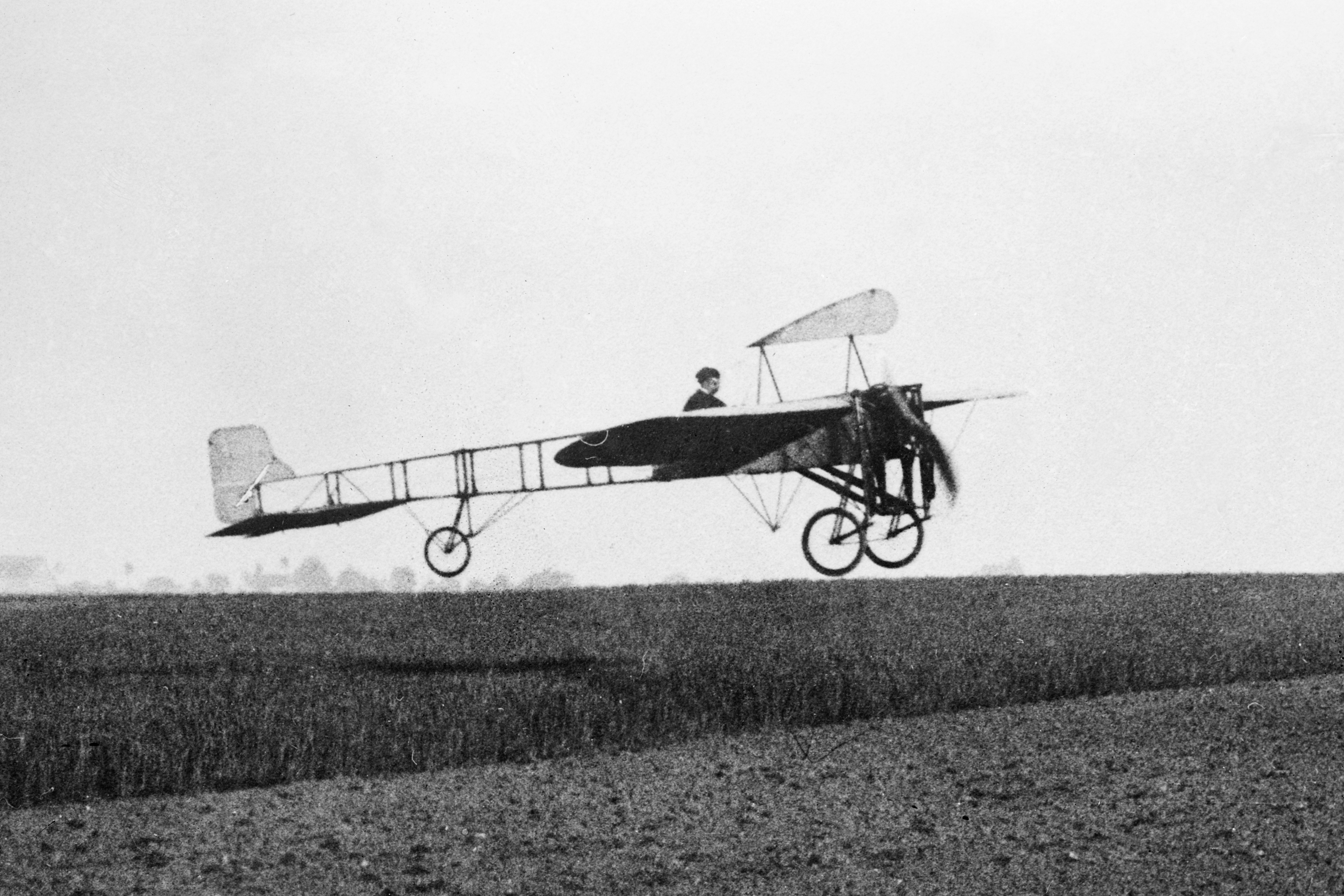
July 25, 1909: Bleriot becomes first man to fly an aircraft across English Channel

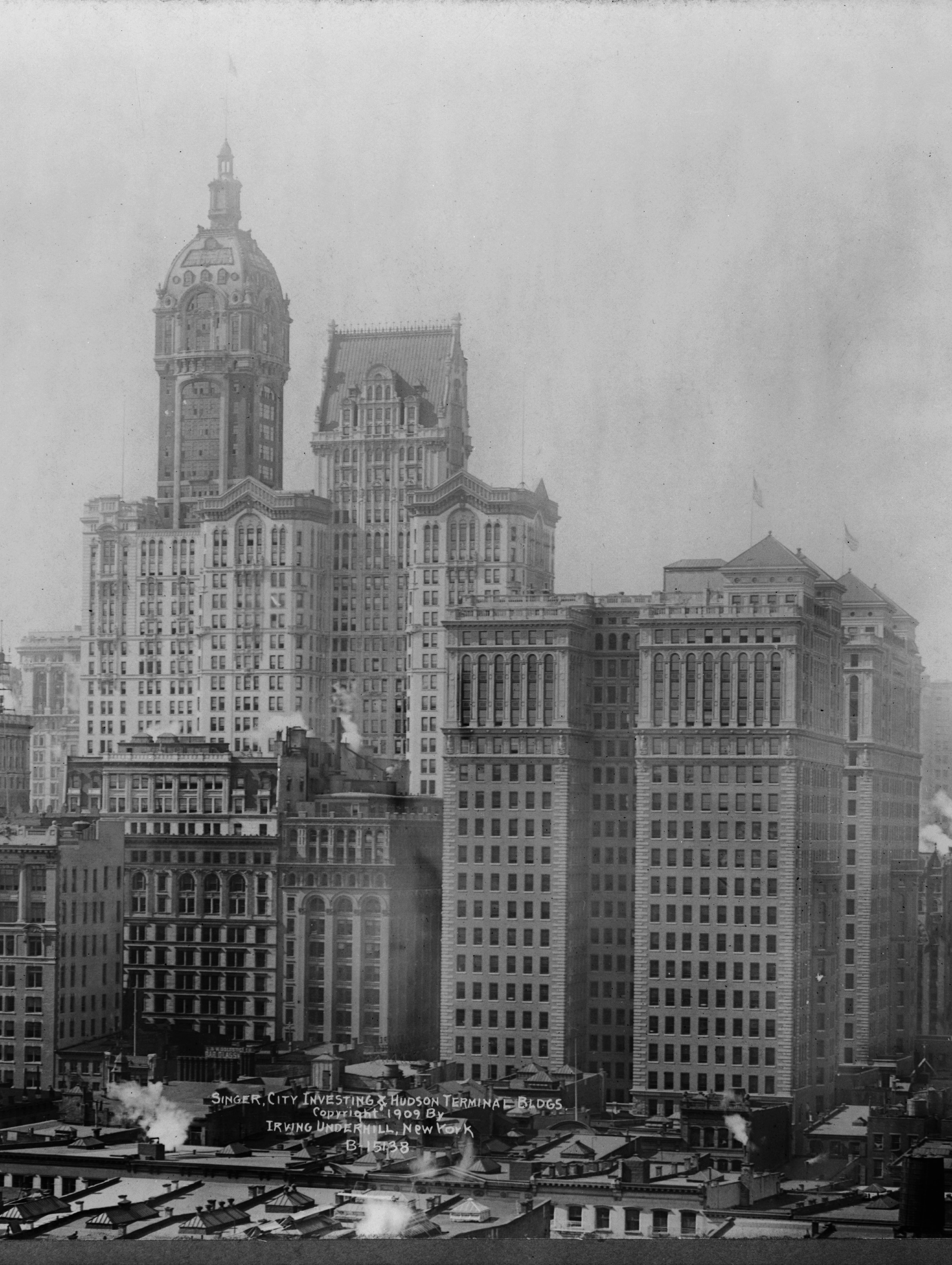
July 19, 1909: Hudson Terminal and 22-storey twin towers open at future site of World Trade Center in New York

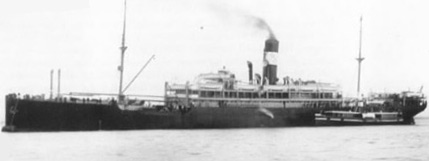
July 27, 1909: SS Waratah and 211 people on board vanish without a trace

The following events occurred in July 1909:

== July 1, 1909 (Thursday) ==
- In the first political assassination in Britain attempted since 1882, Curzon Wyllie, chief aide to British India's Secretary of State, was shot and killed in London by Indian student nationalist Madan Lal Dhingra. Another bystander, Dr. Cawas Lalcaca, was fatally wounded by Dhingra's shots.
- Clark County, Nevada, Palm Beach County, Florida, and Lincoln County, Montana, all came into existence on the same day.
- Alice Blériot, wife of Louis Blériot, saved a child from death, and the grateful family loaned the almost bankrupt aviator 25,000 francs, enough to help him perfect his Blériot XI airplane in an attempt to be the first person to fly across the English Channel.
- Arctic explorer Joseph-Elzéar Bernier placed a plaque at Winter Harbour on Melville Island that proclaimed "The Memorial is erected today to commemorate the taking possession for the Dominion of Canada of the whole Arctic Archipelago lying to the north of America from long. 60 W to 141 W up to the latitude of 90 N."

== July 2, 1909 (Friday) ==
- At the BASF laboratories, chemists Fritz Haber and his assistant, Robert Le Rossignol, first demonstrated a nitrogen fixation process for synthesizing ammonia from hydrogen and nitrogen, using osmium as the catalyst. Carl Bosch and Alwin Mittasch adapted the Haber Process to large scale production, making it possible to artificially produce nitrates for fertilizer.
- Born:
  - Stavros Niarchos, Greek shipping magnate; in Piraeus (d. 1996)
  - Earl Butz, controversial U.S. Secretary of Agriculture, 1971–76; in Albion, Indiana (d. 2008)

== July 3, 1909 (Saturday) ==
- The first Hudson automobile, the "Model 20", came off the assembly line in Detroit. The last Hudson was manufactured in 1957, after the company merged into AMC.
- Federal charges were filed against the manufacturers of Koca Nola, the third most popular cola after Coke and Pepsi, after a one-gallon jug of the syrup was found to include cocaine. Ironically, the company's slogan was "Delicious and Dopeless". The company was fined $100 for "adulteration" and failure to disclose ingredients; bottling of Koca Nola ceased after the company went bankrupt in 1910.

== July 4, 1909 (Sunday) ==
- Architect Daniel Burnham and a team of planners unveiled the Plan of Chicago, also known as the Burnham Plan, a long range vision for the Windy City.
- A 16-foot-tall (4.9 m) pedestal and bust of Abraham Lincoln was dedicated in Scranton, Pennsylvania, at Nay Aug Park. The statue disappeared at some point in the next few decades, and clues to its whereabouts were still being sought a century later.
- France's battleship Danton, the first to have turbine engines, was launched from the shipyard at Brest. The Danton was torpedoed and sunk on March 19, 1917.

== July 5, 1909 (Monday) ==
- Suffragette Marion Wallace Dunlop introduced the "hunger strike" to Britain, after being jailed for disturbing Parliament. Dunlop's fast lasted 91 hours, attracting enough publicity that the government agreed to meet with the suffrage movement leaders. She was released on July 8, becoming a heroine for women's suffrage and an example for protestors ever since.
- The proposed Sixteenth Amendment (income tax) passed the U.S. Senate unanimously, 77–0, and moved on to the House.
- Born: Mohammad Gharib, known as the "Father of Pediatrics in Iran" after authoring a 1941 Persian language textbook on childhood disease; in Tehran (d. 1975)

== July 6, 1909 (Tuesday) ==
- Albert Einstein resigned from his job at the Patent Office in Zürich in order to pursue the full-time study of physics.

== July 7, 1909 (Wednesday) ==
- Physicist Walther Ritz, who had formulated the Ritz method for analyzing combinations of particles, and who had contributed to the Rydberg formula, died of pleurisy in Göttingen at the age of 31.
- T. E. Lawrence, immortalized as "Lawrence of Arabia", departed Britain for his first trip to the Arab world. Lawrence, a second-year undergraduate at Oxford University, traveled to Syria and Palestine for his thesis on the influence of the Crusades on European military architecture.
- Born: Gottfried von Cramm, German tennis player, French Open winner in 1934 and 1936; in Nettlingen, Saxony (killed in auto accident, 1976)

== July 8, 1909 (Thursday) ==
- In a reversal of policy, the British government met with women seeking the right to vote. Home Secretary Herbert Gladstone met with eight representatives, led by Charlotte Despard, after being requested to do so by King Edward VII.
- The first professional baseball game played at night under lights was a Central League game at Grand Rapids, Michigan. The Grand Rapids team beat Zanesville, 11–10.

== July 9, 1909 (Friday) ==
- A boundary dispute between Bolivia and Peru was settled by President José Figueroa Alcorta of Argentina, whom the two nations selected as arbitrator.
- Miss Anita Stewart of New York announced her engagement to Prince Miguel, Duke of Viseu, eldest son of Miguel, Duke of Braganza, the Miguelist pretender to the throne of Portugal. The younger Dom Miguel was the grandson of King Miguel I, who had ruled Portugal from 1828 to 1834.
- Died: Lord Ripon, 82, former Viceroy of India (1880–84) and Leader of the House of Lords (1904–08)

== July 10, 1909 (Saturday) ==
- The United States reached an agreement with Qing China which allowed Chinese students to enroll at American universities. The Imperial Court approved the Qianpai YouMei Xuesheng Banfa Dagang, an outline of regulations for selecting suitable candidates for study in the U.S., after its delivery by the Ministry of Education.

== July 11, 1909 (Sunday) ==
- At 3:00 in the morning, a heat burst south of Cherokee, Oklahoma, reportedly caused the temperature to rise briefly to 136 °F (58 °C), desiccating crops in the area.
- Born: Fritz Leonhardt, German structural engineer; in Stuttgart (died 1999)
- Died: Simon Newcomb, 74, American astronomer

== July 12, 1909 (Monday) ==
- By a margin of 317–14, the U.S. House of Representatives passed a resolution sending the proposed Sixteenth Amendment to the United States Constitution to the states for ratification. Alabama was first (on August 10) to ratify the income tax amendment, which was, on February 3, 1913, ratified by the required 36 states.
- Korea agreed to turn over the functions of prison administration and the court system to Japan. Annexation would follow on August 22, 1910.
- The U.S. ore carrier SS John B. Cowle sank after being rammed by the freighter Isaac M. Scott on Lake Superior, killing 14 of its 24-man crew.
- President Taft set aside 480 acres (1.9 km^{2}) as the Oregon Caves National Monument.
- Born:
  - Bimal Roy, Hindi film director; in Dhaka, Bengal Province, British India (died 1966)
  - Joe DeRita, "the last of the Three Stooges" after replacing Curly Howard; as Joseph Wardell, in Philadelphia (died 1993)
  - Herbert S. Zim, author of science books for children; in New York City (died 1994)

== July 13, 1909 (Tuesday) ==
- Mohammad Ali Shah Qajar, the Shah of Persia, was forced to flee to the Russian embassy after rebel armies poured into the Persian capital of Tehran. Mujahidin forces from the north, and Bakhtiari tribesmen from the south, were joined by local supporters of the revolution. By week's end, constitutional government had been restored.
- Born: Prince Souphanouvong, first President of Laos (1975–1991); in Luang Phrabang, five days before Savang Vatthana, last King of Laos (died 1995)

== July 14, 1909 (Wednesday) ==
- Theobald von Bethmann Hollweg became Chancellor of Germany upon the resignation of Chancellor von Bülow. Bethmann Hollweg served until 1917.
- As the Anglo-Siamese Treaty of 1909 took effect, the Malayan peninsula states of Kedah, Kelantan, Perlis and Terengganu became British protectorates. More than 175,000 square miles (450,000 km^{2}), or half of Thailand's territory, were forfeited.
- The British submarine HMS C11 sank in the English Channel, off Cromer, after the steamer Eddystone sheared off the submarine's stern, killing 13 of the 16 men aboard.
- Edward Payson Weston arrived in San Francisco on the 105th day of his transcontinental walk. He had set off from New York on his 75th birthday on March 15 on a goal of reaching the West Coast in 100 days—not including Sundays—and reached the St. Francis Hotel at 11:15 p.m.
- Born: Frank Tinker, American flying ace and mercenary; in De Witt, Arkansas (died 1939)

== July 15, 1909 (Thursday) ==
- After China refused to let American banks participate with Germany, Britain and France in financing of a railway building project, U.S. President William Howard Taft personally cabled a request to Prince Chun, the regent for the Chinese Emperor, to be allowed in. China renegotiated the agreement to include American banks, and problems with the project later contributed to the downfall of the Empire in 1911.
- Born: Hendrik B. G. Casimir, Dutch theoretical physicist and discoverer of the Casimir effect; at The Hague (died 2000)
- Died: George Tyrrell, 48, Modernist theologian within the Catholic Church

== July 16, 1909 (Friday) ==
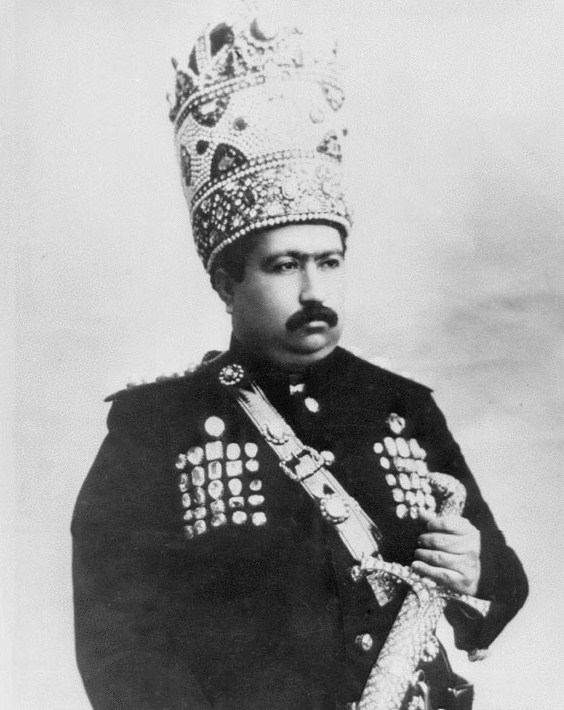
Qajar of Iran

- The Persian Constitutional Revolution succeeded in forcing Mohammad Ali Shah Qajar from the throne of Iran. The National Assembly proclaimed the 12-year-old Crown Prince, Ahmed Mirza, as Shah, and Azud ul Mulk as regent.
- August Horch founded the Horch Automobile Works in Zwickau, beginning a century of manufacture of luxury autos. Because a company he had founded in 1899 already made Horch automobiles, Horch—whose surname meant "Hark!" in German—chose the Latin equivalent, Audi.
- The Detroit Tigers and the visiting Washington Senators played 18 scoreless innings of baseball before darkness ended the game. The 0–0 tie was bettered on September 11, 1945, by a 19 inning scoreless game between the Reds and Dodgers.

== July 17, 1909 (Saturday) ==
- Glenn Curtiss piloted the airplane Gold Bug for 15.5 miles (24.9 km) at Mineola, New York, earning a $10,000 prize from Scientific American magazine.
- After 45 consecutive at-bats without a hit, Brooklyn Dodgers' catcher Bill Bergen got a single. The record still stands a century later.
- Huntington Beach, California, was incorporated, with 915 residents within its 3.57 square miles (9.2 km^{2}). From 1960 to 1970, with the annexation of adjoining farmland, the city's population grew tenfold, from 11,492 to 115,960, and is now nearly 200,000 inhabitants.

== July 18, 1909 (Sunday) ==
- Film actor Larry Semon violated the magician's code by starting a weekly newspaper series, "Mysteries of Magic, Past and Present, Exposed" in the newspaper The North American. Semon revealed secrets of various tricks over 35 columns, stopping in March 1910.
- An earthquake at the New Madrid Fault damaged the town of Petersburg, Illinois.
- Born:
  - Andrei Gromyko, Soviet Belarusan statesman and Foreign Minister of the Soviet Union, 1957–1985; in Staryye Gromyki, Gomel, Russian Empire (now in Belarus) (d. 1989)
  - Sri Savang Vatthana, the last King of Laos (1959–1975), in Luang Phrabang (d. 1978)
  - Mohammed Daoud Khan, first President of Afghanistan 1973–1978 and Prime Minister 1953–1963 (assassinated 1978)
  - Harriet Nelson, American actress known for The Adventures of Ozzie and Harriet; as Peggy Lou Snyder, in Des Moines, Iowa (d. 1994)
- Died: Carlos, Duke of Madrid, 61, Carlists pretender to throne of Spain (as Carlos VII) and as Legitimist pretender to the throne of France (as Charles XI), died in exile in Italy. Between 1872 and 1876, he led the Third Carlist War against the First Spanish Republic and controlled much of Catalonia and the Basque Provinces. His 39-year-old son, Don Jaime de Borbón y de Borbón-Parma, was referred to by Carlists as King Jaime III of Spain and by Legitimists as King Jacques I of France.

== July 19, 1909 (Monday) ==
- The Hudson & Manhattan Railroad's Hudson Terminal, the largest underground station in New York City, was opened at 10:15 a.m., connecting Manhattan to Jersey City. The terminal, located at Cortlandt and Church Streets, was operated by the Hudson and Manhattan Railroad, and would later become the World Trade Center PATH station. Two 22-story towers for the H & M Railroad, at the time the "nation's largest office buildings" would later be replaced by the twin 110-story WTC office buildings, which would be destroyed on September 11, 2001.
- In Cleveland, Neal Ball of the Cleveland Indians made the first unassisted triple play in major league history, in the second inning of a 6–1 win over the Boston Red Sox. Ball caught a hit by Amby McConnell, stepped on second base before Heinie Wagner could return, and tagged Jake Stahl, who was trying to run back to first base. The 14th and most recent such play was also in Cleveland, by Asdrúbal Cabrera on May 11, 2008.
- Hubert Latham's attempt to be the first to fly an airplane across the English Channel failed, when the engine on the Antoinette IV failed seven miles (11 km) into the trip. The French destroyer Harpon rescued both pilot and airplane. Six days later, Louis Blériot would cross the Channel.
- Died: Arai Ikunosuke, 73, Japanese samurai

== July 20, 1909 (Tuesday) ==
- Georges Clemenceau resigned as Prime Minister of France after a violent argument in the Chamber of Deputies with former Foreign Minister Theophile Delcasse. A vote of no confidence followed, with the Clemenceau government losing 212–176, and the premier quitting after nearly three years. Clemenceau, who was succeeded by Aristide Briand, would become Premier again in 1917.

== July 21, 1909 (Wednesday) ==
- The first baseball game in Korea took place in Seoul. Yun Ik-hyon and 24 other Korean university students had learned the game while studying in Tokyo, and organized a match against American foreign missionaries. The Korea Baseball Organization would later refer to it as "the turning point for Korean baseball".

== July 22, 1909 (Thursday) ==
- The Republic of Paraguay enacted its first compulsory education law, requiring all children, 5 to 14, to attend school. On September 6, the "Law for the Conversion of the Indian Tribes" was enacted, providing for public land grants of 7,500 hectares (roughly 29 square miles) to establish schools, churches and housing for Indians converted to Christianity.

== July 23, 1909 (Friday) ==
- Alliott Verdon "A.V." Roe piloted the first British-manufactured aeroplane, the Roe I Triplane, flying 850 feet (260 m) at the Walthamstow Marshes in East London, at an altitude of 10 feet (3.0 m) and an average speed of 25 mph (40 km/h). Roe went on to found the airplane manufacturer Avro.
- Sir Frederick Holder, Speaker of the Australian House of Representatives, collapsed at 5:06 a.m. while presiding over an all-night session, and died a few hours later without regaining consciousness. Reportedly, his last words during the tumultuous session were "Dreadful! Dreadful!"
- Born: Helen Martin, African-American TV actress known for Good Times and 227; in St. Louis (died 2000)

== July 24, 1909 (Saturday) ==
- At D'Urville Island, New Zealand, the first sighting was made of an "Aerialite", a brightly lit object flying over the bay. For the next six weeks, the unidentified flying object was observed across New Zealand from Otago to Auckland.
- John Flanagan became the oldest person to break a sports record when he had a distance of 56.18 metres (184.3 ft) in the hammer throw. The Irish-born, NYPD cop was 41 years old.
- Born: John George Haigh, British serial killer, in Stamford, Lincolnshire (hanged 1949)

== July 25, 1909 (Sunday) ==
- Louis Blériot landed the Blériot XI at 5:17 a.m. in England, at Northfall Meadow near Dover. Having taken off from the French village of Les Baraques, near Calais, 36 minutes earlier, Blériot became the first person to fly an airplane across the English Channel and made the first international flight as well. A British newspaper noted the next day, "England's isolation has ended once and for all." Blériot, who was recovering from surgery and had no compass, crash-landed. Legend has it that the 25 horsepower (19 kW) airplane engine was saved from overheating by a slight drizzle as he neared the English coast. Blériot won a £1,000 prize from the London Daily Mail and received hundreds of orders for his airplane.
- Charles K. Hamilton flew his airship across the Bay of Osaka in Japan.

== July 26, 1909 (Monday) ==
- The SS Waratah departed Durban, South Africa, with 211 passengers and crew on board, bound for a 3-day journey to Cape Town, its next stop on a voyage from Australia to Britain. The Waratah was spotted on the 27th by the Clan MacIntyre, and never seen again. Explorer Emlyn Brown thought he had located the wreckage in 1999, but had found, instead, a freighter sunk during World War II. As of 2026, no trace of the Waratah has been found.
- Born: Vivian Vance, American actress best known for portraying Ethel Mertz on I Love Lucy, for which she won the Emmy Award in 1954; as Vivian Roberta Jones in Cherryvale, Kansas (died 1979)

== July 27, 1909 (Tuesday) ==
- At Fort Myer, Virginia, Orville Wright and his passenger, Lt. Frank P. Lahm, went aloft in the Wright Military Flyer. Staying aloft for more than one hour (1:12:37.8), Wright met the first requirement of the U.S. Army Signal Corps' Specification No. 486.

== July 28, 1909 (Wednesday) ==
- National League President Harry Pulliam shot himself in the head and died the following day.
- The Board of the Ford Motor Company voted to build its first assembly plant outside of Michigan, settling on 1025 Winchester Avenue in Kansas City, Missouri.
- Born: Malcolm Lowry, English-born Canadian novelist; in New Brighton, Cheshire (died 1957)

== July 29, 1909 (Thursday) ==
- General Motors acquired the Cadillac Motor Company from Henry M. Leland for $5.5 million.
- Amid concerns that African workers recruited from Angola were being exploited as slave labor by the chocolate maker Cadbury Brothers Ltd, Portugal's Colonial Minister, Manuel da Terra Vianna, barred further recruitment until an investigation could be made.
- Born: Chester Himes, African-American author; in Jefferson City, Missouri (died 1984)

== July 30, 1909 (Friday) ==
- With Benjamin Foulois as navigator and observer, Orville Wright passed the final requirement of the U.S. Army Signal Corps for a military airplane. A crowd of 7,000 turned out at Fort Myer, Virginia, to see if the Wright Military Flyer could average 40 miles (64 km) per hour over ten miles (16 km). Wright and Foulois flew five miles (8.0 km) to Alexandria, rounded Shooter's Hill, and returned in less than 15 minutes. For reaching 42.5 mph (68.4 km/h), Wilbur and Orville Wright earned an additional $5,000 along with the $25,000 award.
- When the House of Lords blocked his proposed budget, David Lloyd George, Britain's Chancellor of the Exchequer, made the "Limehouse Speech" in the East London neighborhood of the same name. Referring to the House of Lords, Lloyd George said, "The question will be asked whether 500 men, ordinary men chosen accidentally from the unemployed, should override ... the deliberate judgment of millions of people who are engaged in the industry which makes the wealth of this country." The power of the House of Lords was reduced two years later by the Parliament Act 1911.
- An earthquake in Mexico heavily damaged the towns of Acapulco and Chilpancingo, and an aftershock the following day destroyed water mains in Mexico City.
- Cosmetic brand L'Oreal was founded by Eugène Schueller in France.
- Born: C. Northcote Parkinson, British historian and author of Parkinson's Law, in Barnard Castle (d. 1993)

== July 31, 1909 (Saturday) ==
- Sheikh Fazlollah Noori, a Shi'ite Muslim leader in Iran, was hanged for treason after resisting the Iranian Constitutional Revolution. Seventy years later, after the Iranian Revolution of 1979, the Sheikh was proclaimed a national hero by the Ayatollah Khomeini.
- The Zion National Park was established by order of U.S. President William Howard Taft, who set aside 15,840 acres (24.75 square miles) as the Mukuntuweap National Monument.
- A time capsule was placed in the cornerstone of the Summit County Courthouse in Breckenridge, Colorado. The capsule was opened on August 8, 2009.
- Born: Paul "Mousie" Garner, American comedian; in Washington, D.C. (died 2004)
