= June 1909 =

Month in 1909

<<	June 1909					>>
Su	Mo	Tu	We	Th	Fr	Sa
		1	2	3	4	5
6	7	8	9	10	11	12
13	14	15	16	17	18	19
20	21	22	23	24	25	26
27	28	29	30

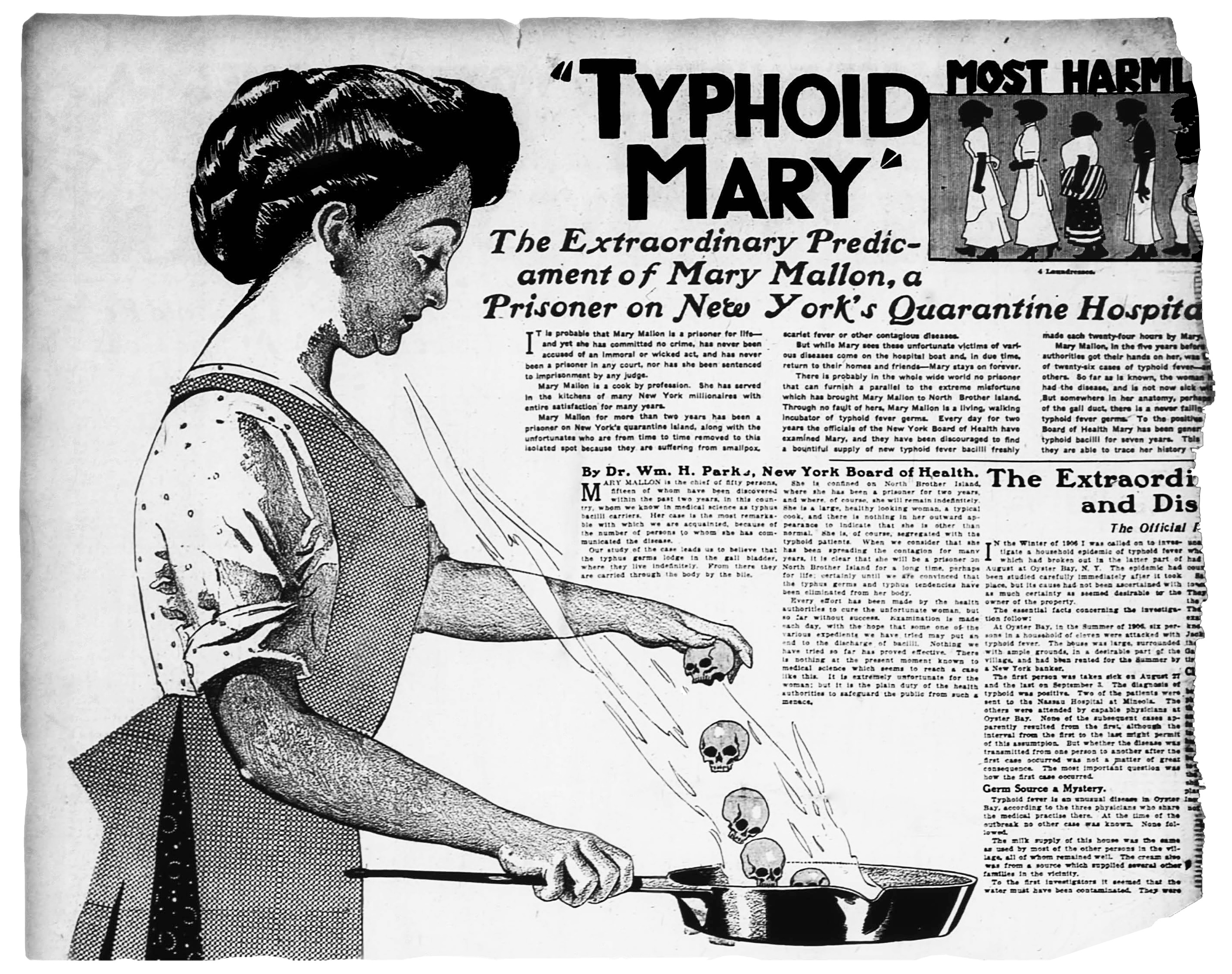
June 20, 1909: "Typhoid Mary" Mallon story exposed

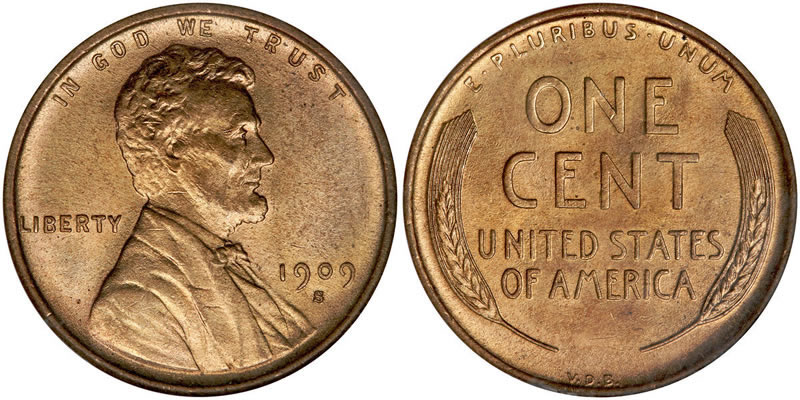
June 10, 1909: U.S. introduces new coin honoring Abraham Lincoln

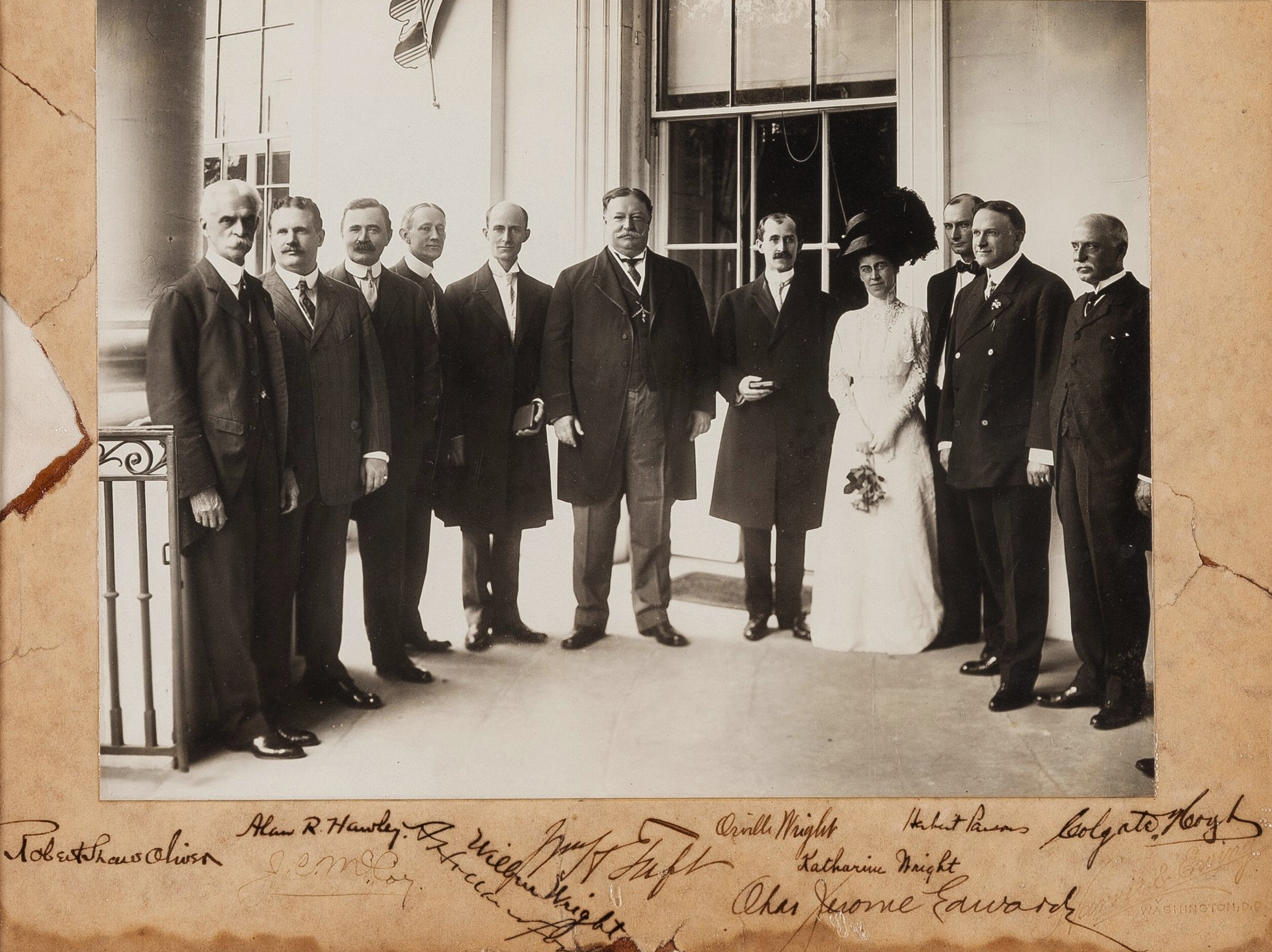
June 18, 1909: Wilbur and Orville right presented medal by President Taft (center)

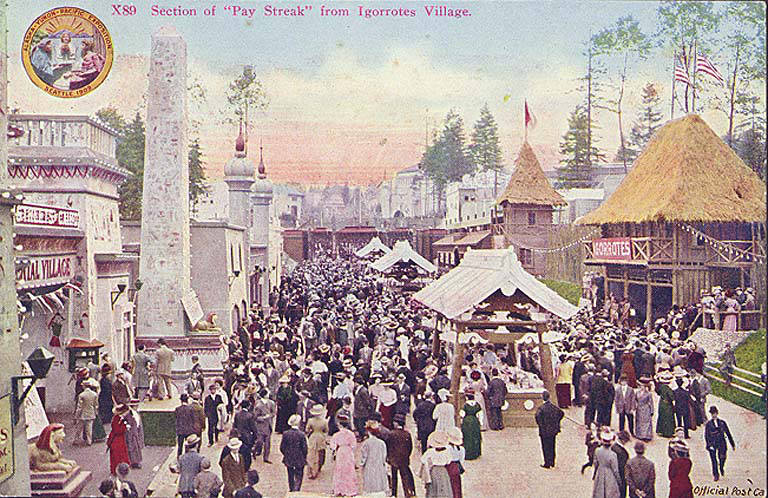
June 1, 1909: Alaska Yukon Pacific Exposition opens in Seattle

The following events occurred in June 1909:

== June 1, 1909 (Tuesday) ==
- The Alaska-Yukon-Pacific Exposition opened in Seattle at 8:30 am. From the White House, U.S. President William Howard Taft pressed "a telegraph key of Alaska gold" to signal the opening of the fair. A crowd of 89,286 turned out on the first day.
- Andrew Fisher resigned as Prime Minister of Australia after six months. He was succeeded by Alfred Deakin, who had joined with Joseph Cook in creating the Fusion Party. Deakin, who had been premier twice before, formed a government with Cook as Minister of Defence.

== June 2, 1909 (Wednesday) ==
- Muhammad Da´ud Murra ibn Yusuf, ruler since 1901 of the Ouaddai Kingdom in the northern part of what is now Chad, was forced to flee after French troops succeeded in capturing the capital at Abéché. The French forces released Adam Asil from confinement and placed him on the throne as a puppet ruler, while incorporating the kingdom into French Equatorial Africa.
- Harmon County, Oklahoma, was created by gubernatorial proclamation after being approved in an election on May 22. The new county was named in honor of Judson Harmon, who was Governor of Ohio at the time.

== June 3, 1909 (Thursday) ==
- Seven months after the fatal crash that killed Lt. Thomas E. Selfridge, the Wright brothers returned to Fort Myer, Virginia, with the improved Wright Military Flyer, which passed the U.S. Army's tests and was accepted on August 2.
- Left with only four ships after the Russo-Japanese War, the Russian Navy commenced rebuilding. The keels were laid down for four dreadnoughts (Gangut, Poltava, Sevastopol and Petropavlovsk), which were all launched in the summer of 1911.
- Born: Ira D. Wallach, American businessman and philanthropist; in New York City; (d. 2007)

== June 4, 1909 (Friday) ==
- "Japanese Navy Day" was held at the A-Y-P Exposition in Seattle.

== June 5, 1909 (Saturday) ==
- In Somerville, Massachusetts, a butcher at the North Packing and Provision Company slaughterhouse attacked his co-workers with his 15-inch (380 mm) knife. Five men were killed and four more wounded before John Murphy was overpowered and arrested.
- The first race was held at the Indianapolis Motor Speedway, with three competitors setting off at 3:45 p.m. and ascending into the sky—in balloons. Six more balloons were launched at 5:00 pm for a distance race. John Berry, piloting the University City, landed in Alabama two days later, winning the endurance and distance races.

== June 6, 1909 (Sunday) ==
- The Hukuang Loan agreement was signed between the Imperial Chinese government and a consortium of British, German and French banks, providing that the bankers would finance the construction of two railroad lines in central China, connecting Canton, Hankow and Chengtu to the Beijing line. After the agreement was signed, the United States pressed for its own banks to be part of the program. The agreement was renegotiated, delaying construction of the railroad. Public outrage over the handling of the loan was later described as "one of the links in the chain of events that caused the revolution" of 1911, which overthrew the Empire in favor of a republic.
- Born: Isaiah Berlin, Russian-born British social theorist; in Riga, Latvia, Russian Empire (d. 1997)

== June 7, 1909 (Monday) ==
- The Unfair Competition Act of 1909 was enacted in Germany, prohibiting five categories of anti-competitive business practices, and providing for injunctions and civil damages. Under the UWG (Unlauterer-Wettbewerb-Gesetz), fishing for customers, obstructive practices, exploitation of reputation, breach of law and disturbance of the market are barred.
- The first Imperial Press Conference began in London, lasting until June 20. It was attended by delegates from Australia, Canada, India and other countries in the British Empire. Much discussion centred on anti-competitive behavior of the privately-owned cable news services, and calls were made for trans-oceanic cables to be nationalized. In a keynote speech Guglielmo Marconi predicted the rise of wireless news services.
- Born: Jessica Tandy, English-born American actress; in Hackney, London (d. 1994)

== June 8, 1909 (Tuesday) ==
- An earthquake and tsunami destroyed the town of Korinchi on the island of Sumatra, now part of Indonesia, killing at least 230.

== June 9, 1909 (Wednesday) ==
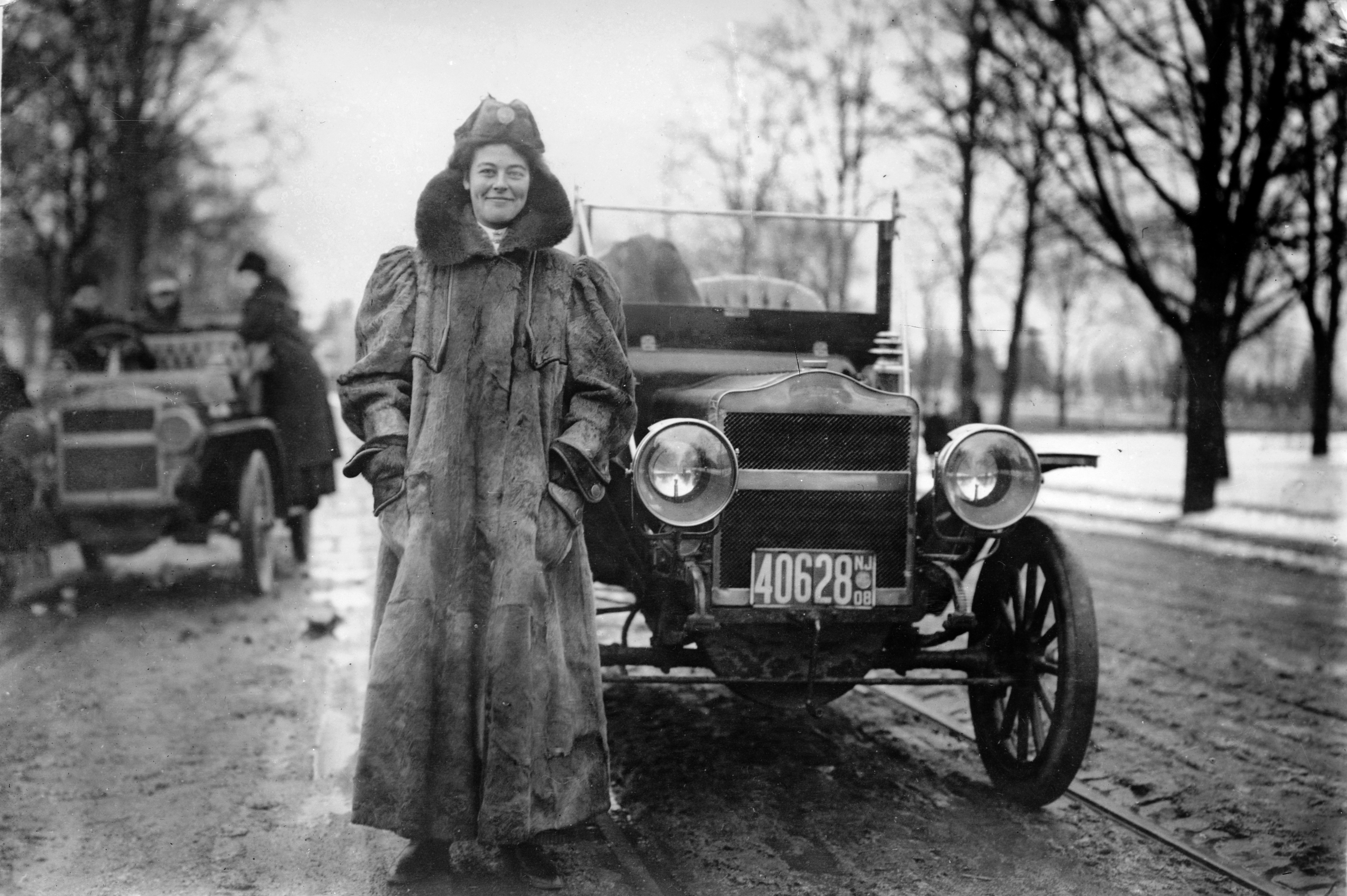
Mrs. Ramsey

- Alice Huyler Ramsey set off from New York to become the first woman to drive across the United States, setting off from the Maxwell Motors dealership at 1930 Broadway Street in New York, along with three female companions. The 22-year-old housewife and mother from Hackensack reached Chicago on June 18 and the four arrived in San Francisco on August 6, 59 days and 3,800 miles after departing. John D. Murphy of the Boston Herald handled publicity for Mrs. Ramsey, traveling ahead by train to prepare for each stop. Since there were no road maps for the Western U.S., Murphy went ahead in another car and followed telephone lines in order to avoid getting lost.
- Ali bin Hamud al-Busaid, the Sultan of Zanzibar, decreed that compensation claims for former slaveholders would no longer be considered after the end of 1911. Slavery had been abolished in the African nation in 1897, but the practice continued unofficially. Most slaveholders were Arab clover farmers, who used black African field hands.
- Born:
  - Virginia Apgar, American physician who developed the Apgar score in 1952, which aids in determining whether a newborn infant requires emergency medical attention; in Westfield, New Jersey (d. 1974)
  - Peter Rodino, New Jersey Congressman who chaired the House Judiciary Committee that in 1974 voted to impeach President Richard Nixon; as Pellegrino Rodino, Jr., in West Orange, New Jersey (d. 2005)

== June 10, 1909 (Thursday) ==
- The Cunard ocean liner RMS Slavonia, with 400 passengers on board, struck rocks off Flores Island (Azores) and sank, the line's only passenger ship lost on a peacetime voyage this century. She became the first vessel to send the new international SOS wireless distress call, and all aboard were rescued by the Princess Irene, which was 180 miles (290 km) away when the call was received.

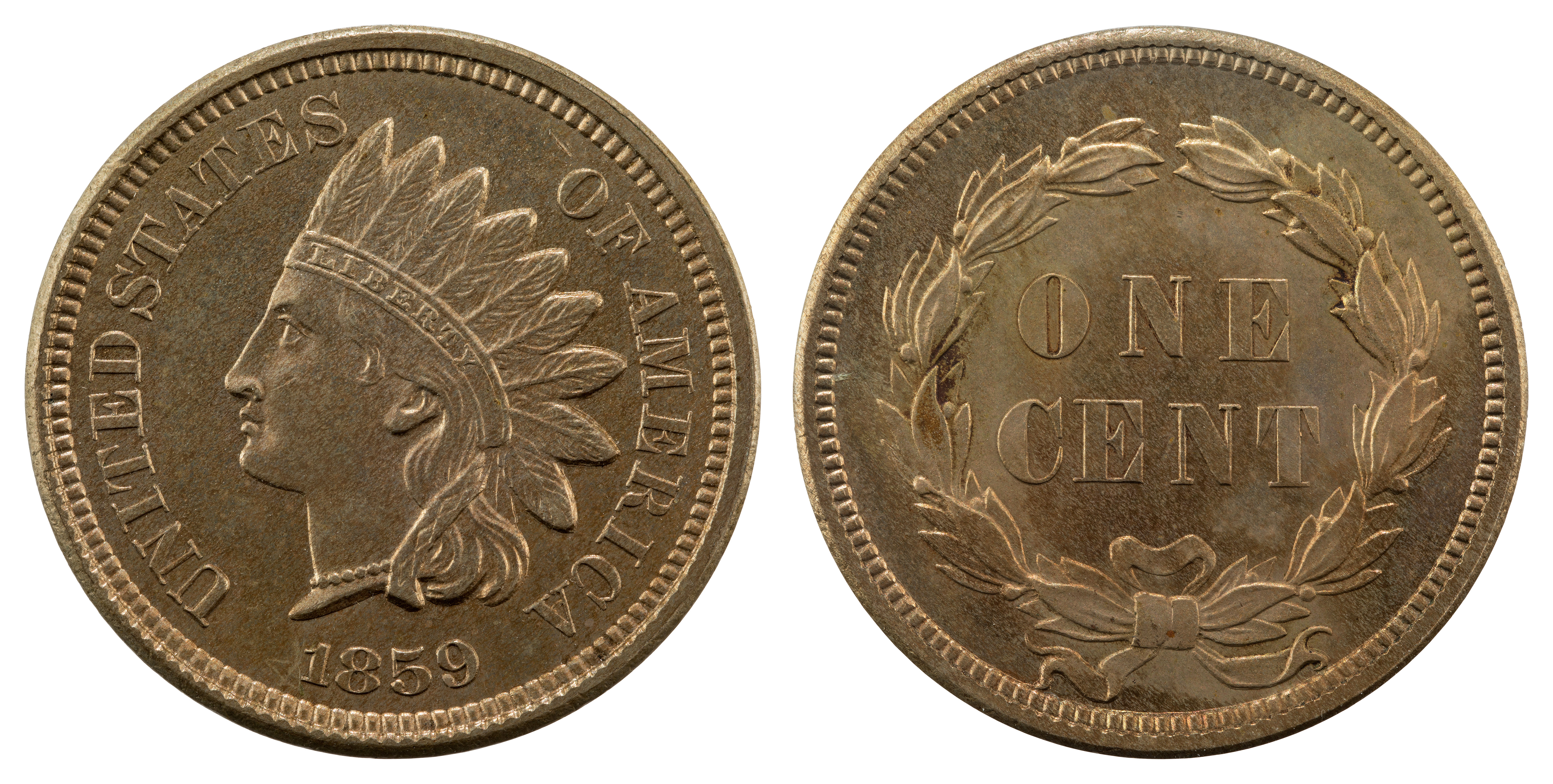
The old "Indian head penny"

- The very first Lincoln cent coins were manufactured, as the Philadelphia Mint began production of the new penny, which was released into circulation on August 2. The first 25 million pennies included the initials "V.D.B.", placed on the dies designed by sculptor Victor D. Brenner, until the U.S. Mint eliminated the "signature" beginning August 12. The new one cent coin replaced the Indian Head cent which had been introduced 50 years earlier in 1859.
- Died: Edward Everett Hale, 87, American author, Unitarian minister, and abolitionist

== June 11, 1909 (Friday) ==
- At 9:16 in the evening, an earthquake struck Rognes, Lambesc and neighbouring villages in Southern France, killing 46 people. Rognes was half destroyed, especially the houses on the flanks of the hill Le Foussa. People were relocated under tents on another hill Le devin and near the primary school. Had the earthquake happened an hour later, more people would have been in bed, hence more casualties would have been recorded. The quake was the largest in France during the 20th century.
- George S. Patton graduated from the United States Military Academy at West Point, ranked 46th in his class of 103.

== June 12, 1909 (Saturday) ==
- Three people traveled in an airplane for the first time in history, as Louis Bleriot lifted off from Port-Aviation (often called "Juvisy Airfield") at Viry-Châtillon, France, in a monoplane, carrying Alberto Santos-Dumont and Heraclio Fournier.
- The "non-magnetic" yacht Carnegie was launched. Owned by the Carnegie Institution of Washington, the small ship was designed from materials that would not interfere with the workings of a magnetic compass, making accurate measurements of the Earth's changing magnetic field possible for the first time.
- Born: Archie Bleyer, American song arranger and band leader; in Queens, New York City (d. 1989)

== June 13, 1909 (Sunday) ==
- Colombian President Rafael Reyes abruptly resigned and went into exile. Reyes' five-year dictatorial rule, known as the "Quinquenio", over the South American nation, ended after financial problems and public outrage over his recognition of Panamanian independence forced him to leave.

== June 14, 1909 (Monday) ==
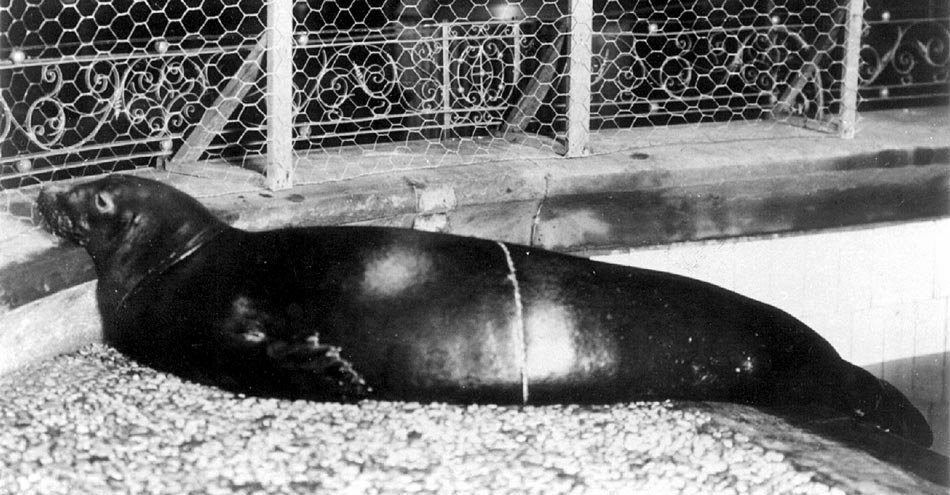
One of the Caribbean monk seals

- Four specimens of the now-extinct Caribbean monk seal (Monachus tropicalis, called at the time the West Indian seal from the West Indies rather than India), and the only ones known to be living in captivity, were brought to the New York Aquarium. The last of the species would be observed in 1952, and NOAA would declare the species extinct in 2008.

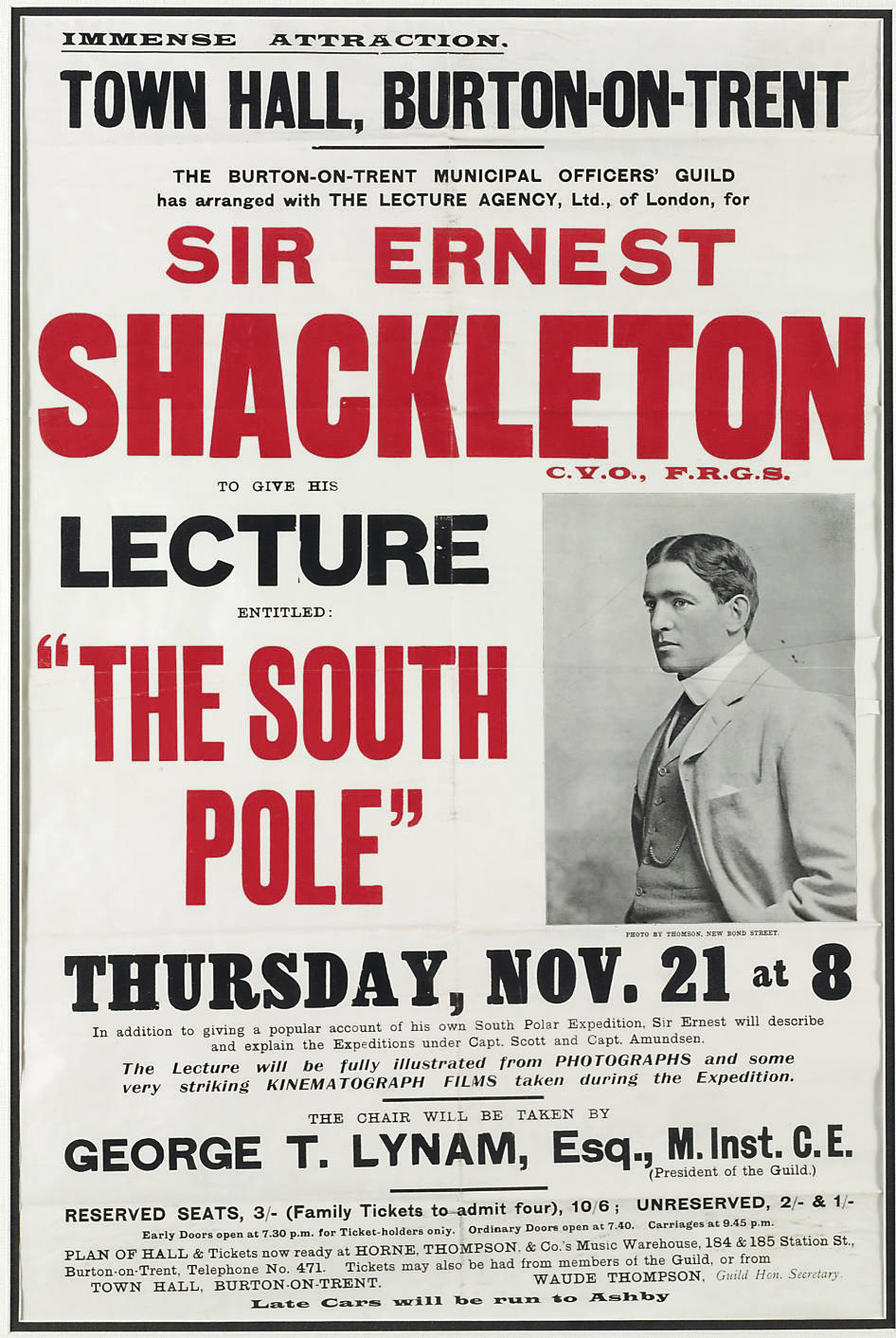

- Antarctic explorer Ernest Shackleton returned to a hero's welcome in London, and was knighted by King Edward VII.
- Prince Itō Hirobumi was forced to resign as Japan's Resident-General of Korea, at that time a Japanese protectorate, and was replaced by Baron Sone Arasuke. Ito's assassination, three months later, would lead to Korea being annexed.
- Born:
  - Burl Ives, American singer, actor and voice artist; in Hunt City, Illinois (d. 1995)
  - Ettore "Ted" DeGrazia, American artist, composer, actor, director, author, designer, sculptor, and architect; in Morenci, Arizona Territory (d. 1982)

== June 15, 1909 (Tuesday) ==
- Nilo Peçanha was sworn into office as the seventh President of Brazil, the day after the sudden death of President Afonso Pena. Peçanha, the descendant of slaves, was the only African-Brazilian president of South American's largest nation. He completed the remaining 17 months of Penna's term, serving until November 15, 1910.
- Representatives from England, Australia and South Africa meet at Lord's Cricket Ground to form the Imperial Cricket Conference.
- The cork center baseball was patented. Benjamin Shibe, later the owner of the Philadelphia Athletics, received U.S. patent No. 924,696.

== June 16, 1909 (Wednesday) ==
- U.S. President William Howard Taft recommended to Congress that it vote to propose an amendment to the United States Constitution to permit the federal government to levy an income tax upon persons and corporations. The Sixteenth Amendment was ratified effective February 25, 1913.

== June 17, 1909 (Thursday) ==
- The ocean liner RMS Megantic began its maiden voyage from Liverpool to Montreal for White Star Lines.
- Kaiser Wilhelm II of Germany and Tsar Nicholas II of Russia held a summit meeting, with sessions taking place on their respective yachts, Hohenzollern and Standart

== June 18, 1909 (Friday) ==
- William Lorimer was sworn in as U.S. Senator from Illinois, after being elected May 26 by the Illinois Senate. After the U.S. Senate determined that the Illinois vote had been tainted by corruption, Lorimer's seat was declared vacant by a 55–28 vote taken on July 14, 1912. The Lorimer scandal was considered a factor in the ratification of the 17th Amendment, providing for U.S. Senators to be elected by popular vote.
- Wilbur and Orville Wright were each presented the Congressional Gold Medal "for their achievements in demonstrating to the world the potential of aerial navigation".
- In what was later known as the "Chinatown Trunk Mystery", 19-year-old Elsie Sigel was found dead at Sun Leung's chop suey restaurant. Sun Leung had reported the disappearance of his cousin, Leon Ling, to the New York Police Department. Sigel had been missing since June 9.

== June 19, 1909 (Saturday) ==
- A train accident in Chicago killed 11 people.

== June 20, 1909 (Sunday) ==
- The New York American first broke the story of Mary Mallon in its Sunday magazine, entitled "'Typhoid Mary' Most Harmless and yet the Most Dangerous Woman in America". Mallon had been quarantined since 1907 by the New York City health department because she continued to work as a cook even after being identified as a carrier of typhoid fever.
- Born: Errol Flynn, Australian-born American film actor; in Hobart, Tasmania (d. 1959)

== June 21, 1909 (Monday) ==
- A heat wave across the eastern United States claimed its first victims, as three people collapsed in New York.
- Fort Mitchell, Kentucky, was incorporated as a city.

== June 22, 1909 (Tuesday) ==
- Construction began on the Cape Cod Canal, which would separate Cape Cod from mainland Massachusetts, United States.
- The team of Bert W. Scott and C. James Smith arrived first in Seattle in a Model T Ford, to win the first transcontinental auto race and a $2,000 prize. The race's sponsor, Henry Ford, then used the victory to promote the sale of Ford automobiles.
- Born: Katherine Dunham, African-American dancer; in Chicago (d. 2006)

== June 23, 1909 (Wednesday) ==
- Under pressure from Russia and Britain, Shah of Iran Muhammad Ali Shah signed into law new electoral rules and promised free elections. Muhammad Ali was deposed anyway on July 16.
- Born: Li Xiannian, President of China 1983 to 1988; in Hong'an, Hubei Province; (d. 1992)

== June 24, 1909 (Thursday) ==
- The Hope Diamond was sold at a loss for $80,000 to Louis Aucoc. The cursed diamond had been bought for the Habib collection at $400,000.
- The German Reichstag voted 195–187 against an inheritance tax proposed by Chancellor Bernhard von Bülow. The Chancellor, who had pushed the tax in the face of the deficits caused by the expansion of the German Navy, resigned on July 16.
- Died: Sarah Orne Jewett, 59, American novelist

== June 25, 1909 (Friday) ==
- Robert Eastman a/k/a Emmett E. Roberts, died of a gunshot as a sheriff's posse closed in on him at St. Michaels, Maryland. Eastman, a former stockbroker, had been sought for the June 19 slaying of Edith Woodill,
- Mrs. Katherine Gould was granted a separation from her husband, millionaire Howard Gould, son of the financier Jay Gould. She was also awarded an alimony of $3,000 a month by a New York court.
- Police in New York rounded up 21 fortune tellers for disorderly conduct, then released them upon the signing of a $1,000 peace bond, which would be payable if they used their psychic powers over the next twelve months.

== June 26, 1909 (Saturday) ==
- A state visit by Tsar Nicholas II to Sweden was marred by the assassination of Major General Otto Ludvig Beckman, Chief of Sweden's Coast Artillery. General Beckman was shot twice outside of Stockholm's Grand Hotel by an assassin who then killed himself. Sweden's King Gustav V hosted a state banquet for the visiting Tsar at the royal palace that evening.
- In Detroit, the Society of Naval Architects and Marine Engineers voted to reject an honorary membership for Noah. Though the biblical ark builder was championed by two nominators as father of the designing profession, the majority agreed with the sentiment that Noah was "a gamekeeper, not a designer primarily".
- In London, the Science Museum came into existence as an independent entity, splitting from The Art Museum (later called the Victoria and Albert Museum).
- Born: Colonel Tom Parker, Netherlands-born American manager of Elvis Presley and other musicians; as Andreas van Kukjk, in Breda (d. 1997)

== June 27, 1909 (Sunday) ==
- In Springfield, Massachusetts, a riot broke out between the Turkish and Syrian communities, following an argument over a married Syrian woman. An estimated 400 people fought for more than an hour along Ferry Street before Springfield police quelled the violence. Said Burak, a leader in the Turkish community, died after being stabbed three times.
- Eric Gordon England, a 17-year-old volunteer, flew French-born painter José Weiss's tailless glider Olive from a launch ramp above Amberley, West Sussex, England in the first recorded soaring flight, the origin of sport gliding.

== June 28, 1909 (Monday) ==
- Guests dined on the roof of the White House for the first time in the history of the American presidency. Because of an ongoing heat wave, President William Howard Taft arranged to have a dinner for distinguished guests al fresco, with tables moved to the top of the West Wing.
- Cincinnati, Ohio, became the first American city to adopt daylight saving time, after the City Council, encouraged by native son President William Howard Taft, voted unanimously to enact the ordinance. Effective May 1, 1910, clocks in Cincinnati would be set ahead one hour, and would fall back on October 1, 1910.

== June 29, 1909 (Tuesday) ==
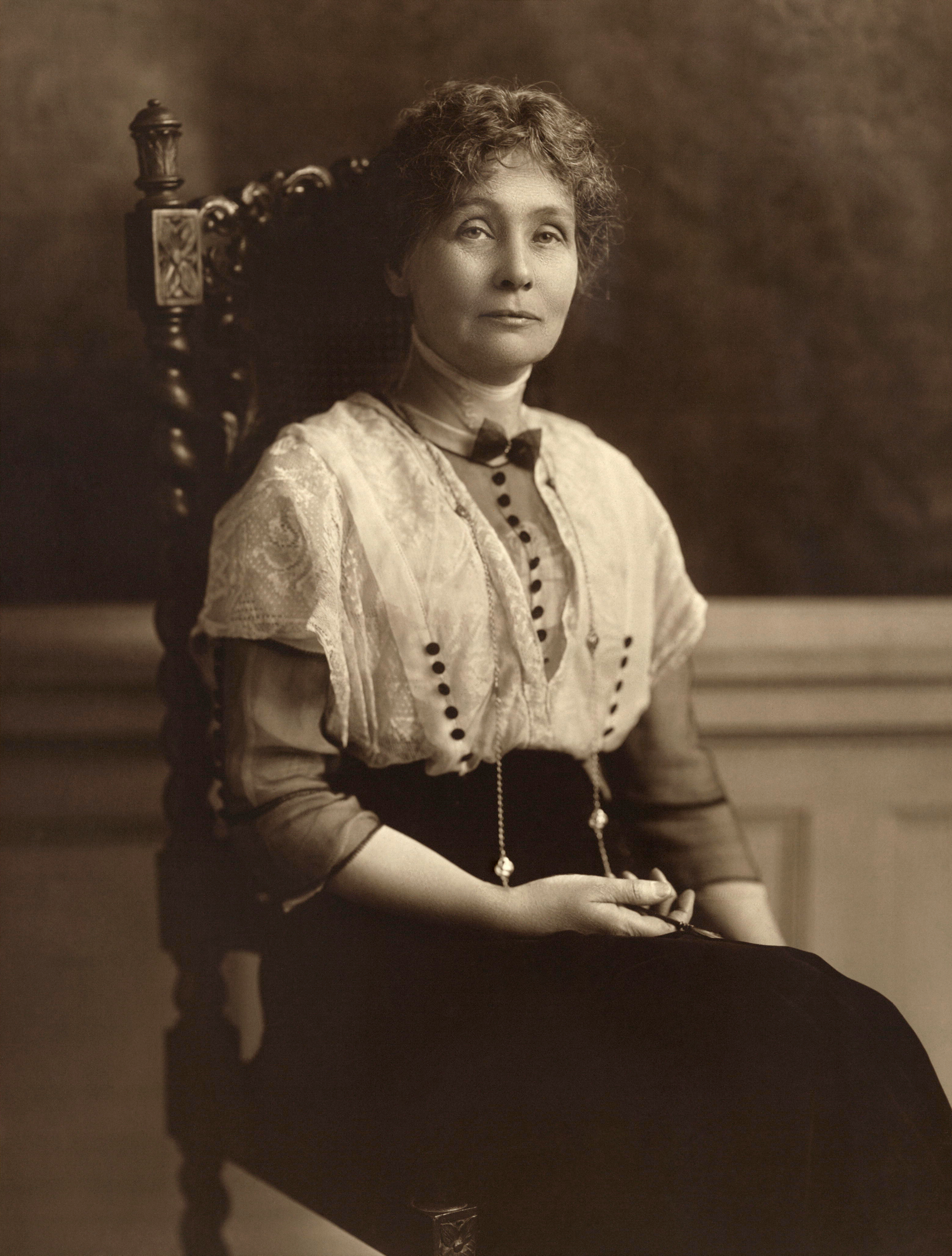
Mrs. Pankhurst

- The women's suffrage movement in Britain took a violent turn after WSPU leader Emmeline Pankhurst marched to Parliament to present a petition to Prime Minister Asquith. When Asquith declined to receive the delegation, Mrs. Pankhurst struck a police inspector. Outside of Parliament, hundreds of suffragettes confronted police officers and began smashing windows. Afterwards, 107 women and eight men were arrested. The right to vote was granted to some women in 1918, and universal suffrage achieved in 1928.

== June 30, 1909 (Wednesday) ==
- Forbes Field in Pittsburgh hosted its first event, as 30,338 spectators watched the Pittsburgh Pirates lose to the Chicago Cubs 3–2. The last event there, a doubleheader baseball game between the Pirates and Cubs, would be played on June 28, 1970. In the opener, the Pirates were the 3-2 winners over the Cubs, followed by a 4–1 win to close the park.
- Born: Juan Bosch, Dominican author and President of the Dominican Republic for seven months in 1963; in La Vega (d. 2001)
