= April 1909 =

Month in 1909

<<	April 1909					>>
Su	Mo	Tu	We	Th	Fr	Sa
				1	2	3
4	5	6	7	8	9	10
11	12	13	14	15	16	17
18	19	20	21	22	23	24
25	26	27	28	29	30

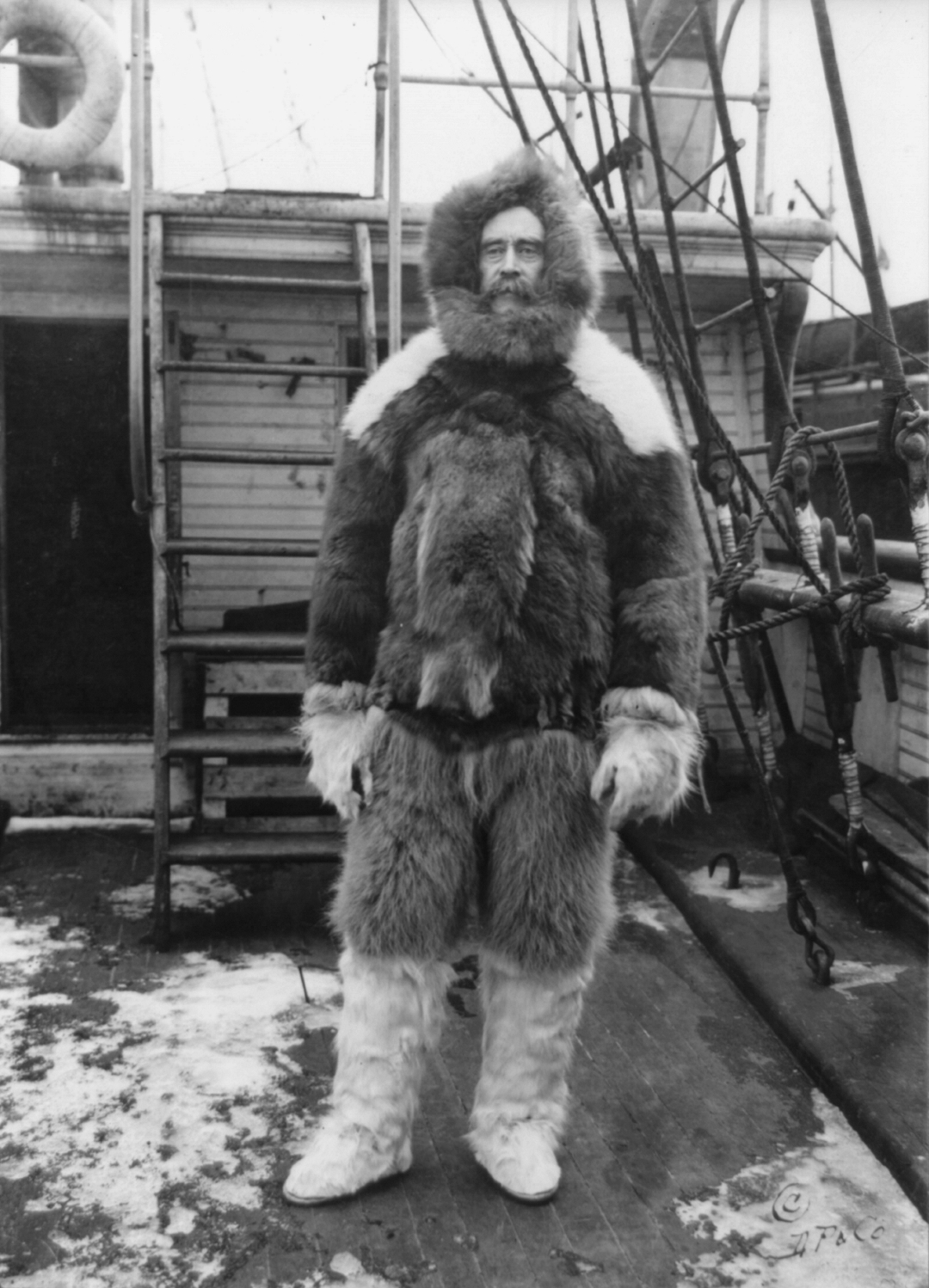
April 6, 1909: Robert Peary, Matthew Henson (below), and four Inuit men claim the North Pole

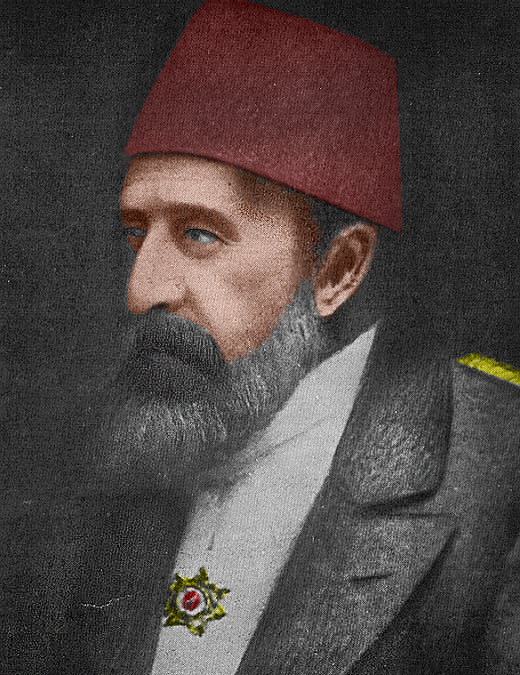
April 27, 1909: Turkish Parliament votes unanimously to depose Sultan Abdul Hamid II

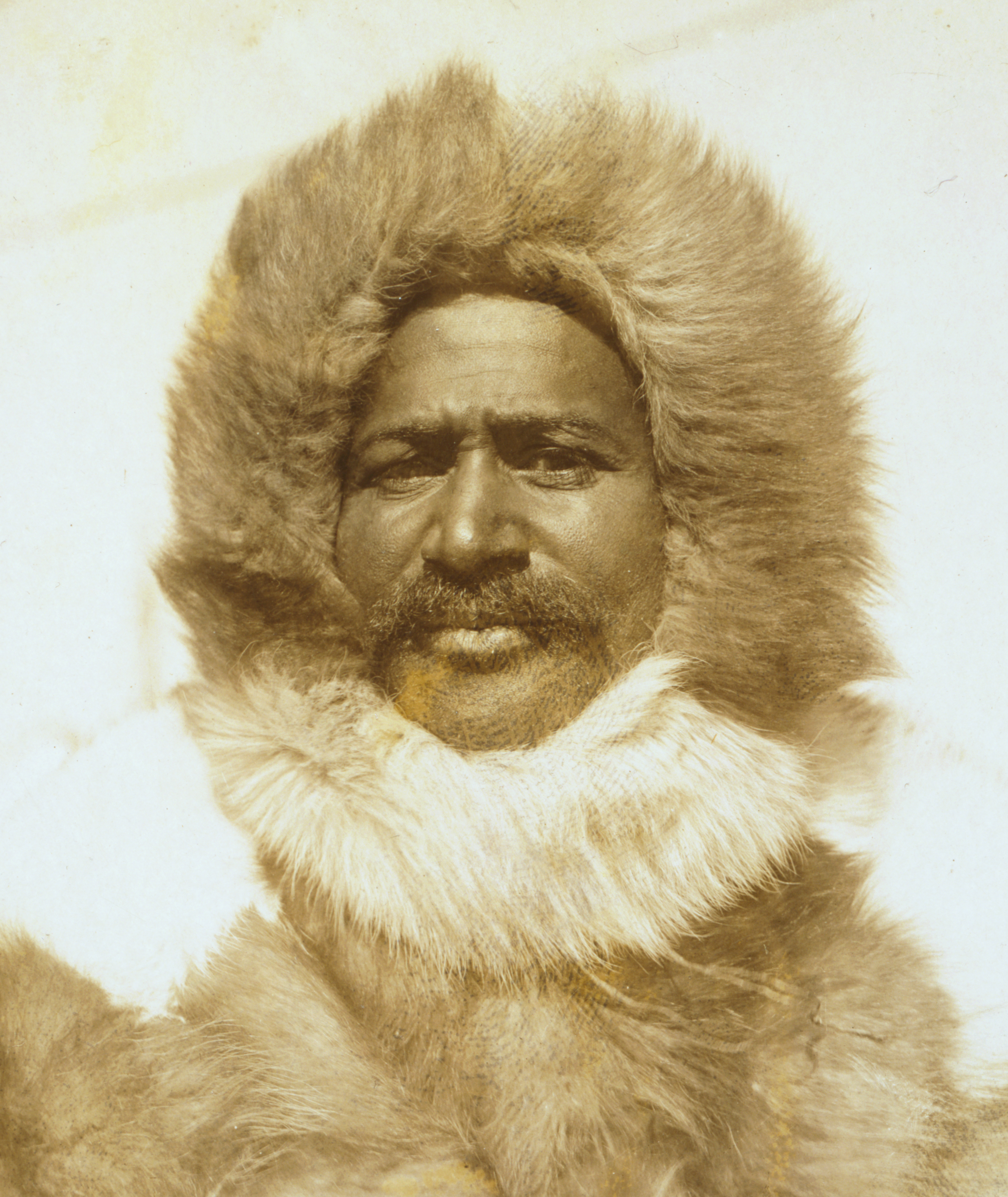
Matthew Henson

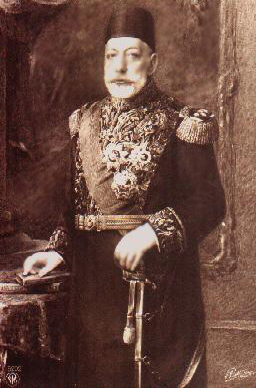
Rechad Effendi proclaimed as new Ottoman Sultan, Mehmed V

The following events occurred in April 1909:

== April 1, 1909 (Thursday) ==
- The Children's Charter went into effect in Great Britain, providing new rules for protection of children, including more severe penalties for the death of a child, and prohibitions against juvenile begging or smoking, and creation of reform schools.
- The day after the raising of the Cuban flag over Camp Columbia, the last American troops left Cuba.
- A law banning the importing of opium into the United States went into effect.
- The New York Times reported that Rameses II, a toad "aged 1,000 years or more", died at the Bronx Zoo. Miners had discovered the toad in 1898 inside a stone near Butte, Montana.
- The six members of the polar expedition – Robert Peary, Matthew Henson, Ootah, Ooqueah, Egingwah, and Seegloo, set off from a point 153 miles (246 km) from the North Pole, and their last supply team turned back.

== April 2, 1909 (Friday) ==
- The Jewish Territorialist Organization released its report from its expedition to Cyrenaica, concluding that the lack of water in the North African nation (now Libya) made it inhospitable as a Jewish homeland.
- The Spring Creek raid, last of the violent attacks in Wyoming's "sheep wars" between cattlemen and sheep ranchers, took place near Tensleep Creek when seven masked cowboys attacked the camp of rancher Joe Allemand, killing him and two of his men, along with several dogs and all 5,000 of his flock of sheep. The public uproar over the senseless crime brought a campaign that ended the feuding.

== April 3, 1909 (Saturday) ==
- In Rome, the former home of poets John Keats and Percy Bysshe Shelley was dedicated as a memorial to both poets. An international committee of writers had raised money to buy and renovate the home near the Scala di Spagna.
- The "$10,000 Marathon Derby" was staged in New York City, promoted as a pro race between the world's six greatest marathon runners. The 26-mile (42 km) run took place at the Polo Grounds, where 30,000 turned out to watch a rematch between Dorando Pietri and Johnny Hayes, but Henri St. Yves won the race and the prize money.
- Died: Admiral Pascual Cervera, 70, commander of the Spanish fleet during the Spanish–American War

== April 4, 1909 (Sunday) ==
- The first speed limits for automobiles took effect in New York City, with a speed limit of 12 miles per hour (19 km/h). On the first day, 19 people were arrested. The first person to be caught was William Hobby, the Police Commissioner for Mount Vernon, New York, who was arrested after trying to elude bicycle patrolman Charles Silberbauer.
- Sport Club Internacional was founded in Porto Alegre, Rio Grande do Sul, Brazil.

== April 5, 1909 (Monday) ==
- The hoax began of the existence of ancient Egyptian ruins in the Grand Canyon in the U.S. state of Arizona, as the Phoenix Gazette published a story headlined "Explorations in Grand Canyon: Mysteries of Immense Rich Cavern Brought to Light". According to the story, a professor S. A. Jordan of the "Smithsonian Institute [sic]" found a vast network of interlinking tunnels and chambers nearly a mile beneath the walls of the Canyon with room to house 50,000 people and filled with treasures and mummies. As another author would note later, "In 1909 the start of the Internet Age was still eighty-five or so years away. But the World Wide Web played a pivotal role in keeping alive a story published as fact."
- Born:
  - Albert R. Broccoli, American film producer who co-produced the first eight James Bond movies; in New York City (d. 1996)
  - Walton Musser, American inventor; in Mount Joy, Pennsylvania (d. 1998)
  - Mikhail Ryazansky, Soviet Russian engineer who designed the transmission system and for the first satellite signals and the ground control guidance units; in Leningrad (d. 1987)

== April 6, 1909 (Tuesday) ==
- Robert E. Peary, Matthew Henson, Ootah, Ooqueah, Egingwah, and Seegloo, reached the northernmost point of their expedition, and Peary planted the United States flag, along with four smaller flags (including one for the Delta Kappa Epsilon fraternity) at what Peary believed to be the North Pole, after measuring the angle of the sun and concluding that he was at 90 degrees north. He wrote in his diary "The Pole at last! My dream and goal for twenty years!" Henson recounted later that the four Eskimos said "Ting neigh tim ah ketisher", which in the Inuit language means "We have got there at last." The six men stayed 30 hours at the Pole, spending the night, and then started back at 4:00 pm. Upon his return to Canada, Peary telegraphed news of his discovery on September 6, only to learn that Frederick Cook had claimed on September 1 to have reached the North Pole the year before. Though Cook's claim was not substantiated, later studies concluded that the location where Peary planted his flags was not the actual Pole. In 1989, the National Geographic Society released a study concluding that Peary had come within 8 kilometres (5.0 mi) of the North Pole.
- Born: William M. Branham, American Christian minister and faith healer; in Cumberland County, Kentucky (killed in auto accident, 1965)

== April 7, 1909 (Wednesday) ==
- U.S. President William Howard Taft issued an executive order directing that deaf-mutes and deaf persons would not be barred from taking the civil service examination.
- Born: Robert Grugeau (pen name for Robert Charroux), French writer and pioneer of the "ancient astronauts" theory; in Payroux (d. 1978)

== April 8, 1909 (Thursday) ==
- Japan's parliament, the Diet, passed a law providing for cooperative societies.
- Great Britain and France announced they assented to the annexation of Bosnia and Herzegovina by the Austrian Empire. Russia and Serbia had prepared to go to war against Austria-Hungary over the 1908 annexation but accepted it in March. The acquiescence of the British and the French brought the crisis to a close.
- A. Leo Stevens announced a forerunner of the airphone, with a specially designed wireless telephone that weighed only 19 1/2 pounds and had been installed on a balloon. "Wireless telephone stations will be established at the top of some high buildings in New York and Boston", Stevens said, "and we expect to be able to give a detailed account of our trip as we are sailing through the air."
- Born: John Fante, American novelist and screenwriter; in Denver (d. 1983)

== April 9, 1909 (Friday) ==
- South Dakota became the first U.S. state to officially recognize Mother's Day by proclamation of Governor Robert S. Vessey. Governor Vessey designated "the second Sabbath in our national memorial month of May", a date that remains in the U.S. and many other nations.
- April 9, 1909, is sometimes cited in error as the date that Robert Peary said that he had reached the North Pole, but April 6 was the date recorded in his diary.

== April 10, 1909 (Saturday) ==
- Professor Ross G. Marvin of Cornell drowned in the Arctic Ocean as Robert Peary's crew returned from the North Pole. Marvin's demise was the only fatality of the expedition.
- Cipriano Castro, ex-President of Venezuela, was forcibly expelled from Martinique by the French government. When Castro refused to leave his hotel, gendarmes placed him on a stretcher and carried him out, then placed him on the ship Versailles to be sent to St. Nazaire.
- The Russification of Finland continued as Tsar Nicholas II approved a recommendation for "laws of general Imperial interest concerning Finland" to be enacted by Russia's parliament rather than Finland's legislature. Finland's participation in the process would be limited to having one representative in the Duma and the Council of State.
- Canada opened up the Métis lands in Alberta to homesteaders, and 250 claims by French Canadians were registered on the first day. The Métis people, descended from intermarriage of European and Canadian Indians, had been provided a colony before the province of Alberta had been established.
- Died: Algernon Charles Swinburne, 72, English poet and inventor of the roundel poem

== April 11, 1909 (Sunday) ==
- A group of 100 settlers, living in the Ottoman-ruled city of Jaffa in Palestine, founded a new community on a 5 hectare (12 acre) plot of sand dunes they had purchased and divided into 60 lots. Referred to at first as Ahuzzat Bayit as buildings and water lines were constructed, the settlement would be renamed on May 21, 1910, for the Hebrew words for a burial mound and for a new spring, combining old and new, as the city of Tel Aviv.

== April 12, 1909 (Monday) ==
- Doc Powers, the popular catcher for baseball's Philadelphia Athletics, became seriously ill after the first game played at the new Shibe Park. In front of a record crowd of 30,162 the hometeam A's won 8–1. Over the next two weeks, Powers (who was a physician as well as a ballplayer) underwent three intestinal operations and died of peritonitis on April 26. Powers said at the time that his problems had happened as a result of eating a cheese sandwich prior to the game, while other observers thought he had been hurt while straining to catch a foul ball, or crashing into a wall.

== April 13, 1909 (Tuesday) ==
- Following the assassination of newspaper editor Hassan Fehmi Effendi, a rebellion broke out among thousands of troops in Constantinople, who surrounded the Parliament House and forced the resignation of the democratically elected Prime Minister, Grand Vizier Hüseyin Hilmi Pasha, and killing the Minister of Justice. Tewfik Pasha replaced Hilmi as Grand Vizier of the Ottoman Empire. The revolution was funded by Sultan Abdul Hamid II, who sought to regain the absolute power that he had prior to democratic reforms, but would backfire on him before the end of the month.
- Born:
  - Eudora Welty, American writer and Pulitzer prize winner; in Jackson, Mississippi (d. 2001)
  - Stanislaw Ulam, Polish-American mathematician and nuclear physicist known for the Teller–Ulam design for thermonuclear weapons; in Lemberg, Austria-Hungary (now Lviv, Ukraine) (d. 1984)

== April 14, 1909 (Wednesday) ==
- After an uprising in the Ottoman Empire province of Adana, the massacre of thousands of Armenians began, with the predominantly Moslem government troops beginning the killing of the predominantly Christian Armenians over a three-day period. Later in the month, a second wave of killings began.
- The Anglo-Persian Oil Company was incorporated in order to exploit oil resources in Iran. The name was changed to the Anglo-Iranian Oil Company in 1935, and in 1954, the British Petroleum Company, now known worldwide as BP.
- Minnesota outlawed the sale and distribution of cigarettes within the state, effective August 1.

== April 15, 1909 (Thursday) ==
- Wilbur and Orville Wright demonstrated their airplane at the Centocelle military field near Rome, at the invitation of Mario Calderara and Umberto Savoia, whom they taught to fly. By the close of their visit on April 26, an Italian air force was Army launched and production of aircraft began at the Facciolli automobile factory later in the year.

== April 16, 1909 (Friday) ==
- The Tendaguru expedition from Germany began excavation of one of the largest collection of dinosaur bones ever discovered. The location, in German East Africa (later Tanganyika and now part of Tanzania) was first spotted in 1907, and yielded 220 tons of fossils and bones from the Mesozoic Era, including a complete skeleton of a Brachiosaurus on display at the Museum für Naturkunde in Berlin.

== April 17, 1909 (Saturday) ==
- In Glasgow, a replay of the Scottish Cup between the Rangers and Celtic at Hampden Park ended after a 1–1 draw. When the game did not go into extra time, thousands of angry fans poured out onto the pitch, and then began destroying the stadium. A force of 200 policemen finally dispersed the crowd, and though there were no fatalities, over 100 people required medical treatment. For the first time, the Scottish Football Association did not award the Cup to any team.
- American First Lady Helen Taft and President William Howard Taft opened West Potomac Park to the general public in Washington, D.C., and provided for concerts every Wednesday and Saturday. Mrs. Taft, who had lobbied for the opening of the park and the planting of cherry trees in the city, arrived with her husband in one of the earliest uses of a presidential automobile.

== April 18, 1909 (Sunday) ==
- Joan of Arc was beatified by decree of Pope Pius X, more than 475 years after her death, in a ceremony at St. Peter's Square that attracted 30,000 pilgrims and cardinals from around the world. Her canonization as a Catholic saint would take place on May 9, 1920.

== April 19, 1909 (Monday) ==
- Jim "Killer" Miller had been a terror in the southwestern U.S. for 25 years. After Miller murdered former U.S. Marshal Gus Bobbitt in 1908, he and the three men who hired him were caught in March 1909, and placed in the Pontotoc County Jail in Ada, Oklahoma, to await trial. At 2:00 a.m. on the 19th, the electric power was cut and more than 100 men broke into the jail, overpowered the guards, and took the four men to a nearby livery stable. Miller, along with Jess West, Joe Allen and B.B. Burwell, were hanged by their vigilante executioners.
- William Howard Taft became the first U.S. president to attend a major league baseball game, as he joined Vice-President Sherman in watching the Washington Senators host the Boston Red Sox. Boston won 8–4.

== April 20, 1909 (Tuesday) ==
- Gladys Smith, 16, of Toronto, was filmed for the first time, appearing in a small role for D. W. Griffith in Her First Biscuits as Mary Pickford. Within five years, Pickford became the most popular film actress of the silent film era.

== April 21, 1909 (Wednesday) ==
- Former U.S. President Theodore Roosevelt arrived at Mombasa in British East Africa (now Kenya) to begin an eight-month-long expedition and safari for the Smithsonian-Roosevelt African Expedition.
- Pope Pius X issued the encyclical "Communion Rerum", praising Saint Anselm of Canterbury, who had died 800 years earlier on April 21, 1109.
- Sarah E. Thompson, who had spied for the United States Army during the Civil War and was the only American woman of her time to draw a soldier's pension, was struck by a trolley while walking in Washington, D.C. She died the next day, and was buried at Arlington National Cemetery with full honors.

== April 22, 1909 (Thursday) ==
- The first dictionary translating the Choctaw Native American language into English was completed by linguist Cyrus Byington for the Bureau of American Ethnology.
- The remains of Pierre L'Enfant, who designed the city of Washington, D.C., were removed from the Green Hill, Maryland (where he had been since 1825), for reburial at Arlington National Cemetery.
- Schütte-Lanz Luftschiffbau, manufacturer of German airships, was incorporated in Mannheim.
- Born: Rita Levi-Montalcini, Italian neurologist and winner of Nobel Prize in Medicine in 1986; in Turin (d. 2012)

== April 23, 1909 (Friday) ==
- William S. Taylor, the 33rd Governor of Kentucky, was pardoned by the 36th Governor Augustus E. Willson. In 1899, Republican Taylor had been declared winner of the gubernatorial election over Democrat William Goebel, but a Court challenge led to Goebel being declared the winner. Goebel was shot, and died shortly after being sworn in as the 34th Governor. Goebel's successor, 35th Governor J.C.W. Beckham, and Taylor both claimed to be Governor, before Taylor fled the state. Under indictment in Kentucky as an accused accessory to Goebel's murder, Taylor stayed in Indiana, which refused to extradite him. Governor Wilson, a Republican, pardoned Taylor and most of the other persons accused of conspiracy to murder.
- The Gimbels Department Store signed a 105-year lease for property at New York's Herald Square, providing for rentals of $60,000,000 until 2014.

== April 24, 1909 (Saturday) ==
- At the Centocelle field in Italy, a camera operator accompanied Wilbur Wright on an airplane flight and shot the first film ever taken from an airplane.
- At the Crystal Palace stadium in London, Manchester United defeated Bristol City on a goal by Sandy Turnbull for a 1–0 win, giving the Manchester club its first of eleven FA Cup titles. Manchester won again in 1948, 1963, 1977, 1983, 1985, 1990, 1994, 1996, 1999, and 2004.
- The National Library of China was founded in Beijing as the Capital Library. With more than 24,000,000 volumes, it is now the fifth largest library in the world.

== April 25, 1909 (Sunday) ==
- A day after marching into Constantinople, the Young Turks under the command of Mahmud Şevket Pasha entered the royal palace under terms of surrender negotiated with Sultan Abdul Hamid II. In return for having his life spared, the Sultan ordered his 4,000 Albanian guards to give up their weapons, and the disarmament took place at noon.
- Born: William Pereira, American architect who designed San Francisco's Transamerica Pyramid; in Chicago (d. 1985)

== April 26, 1909 (Monday) ==
- In Hungary, part of the dual monarchy of the Austro-Hungarian Empire, Prime Minister Alexander Wekerle and his entire cabinet resigned in protest over the Vienna government's lack of support for universal suffrage for the Hungarians, extended use of the Magyar language in Army regiments, and independence for the two Hungarian banks. The crisis continued through the rest of the year until 1910, when a new cabinet took office.
- California became the third American state to enact a eugenic sterilization law for the forced sterilization of intellectually disabled persons. Similar laws had been enacted in Indiana in 1907, and in Washington earlier in 1909.
- Died: Doc Powers, 38, American Major League Baseball catcher, died from peritonitis caused by a post-surgical infection following internal injuries sustained on April 12 while playing a major league game.

== April 27, 1909 (Tuesday) ==
- Ottoman Sultan Abdul Hamid II was deposed by unanimous vote of the Turkish parliament, which had assembled at 8:00 in the morning. No vote could be taken until a fatwa could be approved by the Sheik ul Islam, second only to the Sultan as leader of the Islamic world. The fatwa, which declared that the Sultan had "squandered the wealth of the country", burned the books of the Sharia, and "spilled blood and committed massacres", was delivered at 10:10 a.m., and five minutes later, the Sultan was dethroned. At 10:50, the Senate and the Chamber of Deputies voted to invite the Abdul Hamid's younger brother, Rechad Effendi, to be the new Sultan, and at 4:00, the Sheik administered the oath and Rechad was proclaimed as Sultan Mehmed V. The new Sultan had been kept a virtual prisoner by his older brother since 1876.

== April 28, 1909 (Wednesday) ==
- At 3:00 in Constantinople, the one-time absolute ruler of the Ottoman Empire was put on a train and sent to the city of Salonika, where he would remain under house arrest at the Beylerbeyi Palace. Abdul Hamid's harem was broken up, and executions began of the mutineers who had supported him; he lived until 1918.
- Died: Frederick Holbrook, 85, Governor of the U.S. state of Vermont from 1861 to 1863

== April 29, 1909 (Thursday) ==
- Tornadoes killed 125 people in the southeastern United States, including more than 50 in Tennessee.
- Russian troops under the command of General Snarski invaded Persia and occupied the city of Tabriz in order to stop a rebellion by constitutionalists against the Shah. The troops remained for ten months.

== April 30, 1909 (Friday) ==
- John Moore-Brabazon became the first British pilot to make an airplane flight in Great Britain.
- By order of U.S. President William Howard Taft, the name of the town of "La Boca", on the Pacific side of the Canal Zone, was changed to Balboa. The suggestion had been made by Peru's minister to Panama, Federico Alfonso Pezet, to honor the Spanish explorer.
- Palm Beach County was created in Florida after being split off from Dade County, and West Palm Beach was named the county seat. The county had only 5,000 residents at the time, and now has 1.3 million.
- A patent application was filed for the atomizer nozzle, the first practical paint sprayer, by Thomas A. DeVilbiss of Toledo, Ohio, who had begun manufacture at the DeVilbiss Company. Using compressed air and the technology for atomizers manufactured by DeVilbiss, the spray system made painting move more quickly. U.S. Patent No. 932,604
- Born:
  - Queen Juliana of the Netherlands, who reigned from 1948 to 1980; at Noordeinde Palace in The Hague. The only child of Queen Wilhelmina of the Netherlands, Juliana Louise Emma Marie Wilhelmina was named for Juliana of Stolberg, the mother of William the Silent. Queen Juliana would reign over the Netherlands from 1948 to 1980, abdicating in favor of her daughter, Queen Beatrix, and would live until 2004.
  - F. E. McWilliam, Northern Irish sculptor, in Banbridge, County Down (d. 1992)
