= May 1909 =

Month in 1909

<<	May 1909					>>
Su	Mo	Tu	We	Th	Fr	Sa
						1
2	3	4	5	6	7	8
9	10	11	12	13	14	15
16	17	18	19	20	21	22
23	24	25	26	27	28	29
30	31

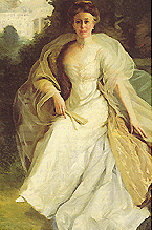
May 17, 1909: U.S. First Lady Nellie Taft suffers stroke

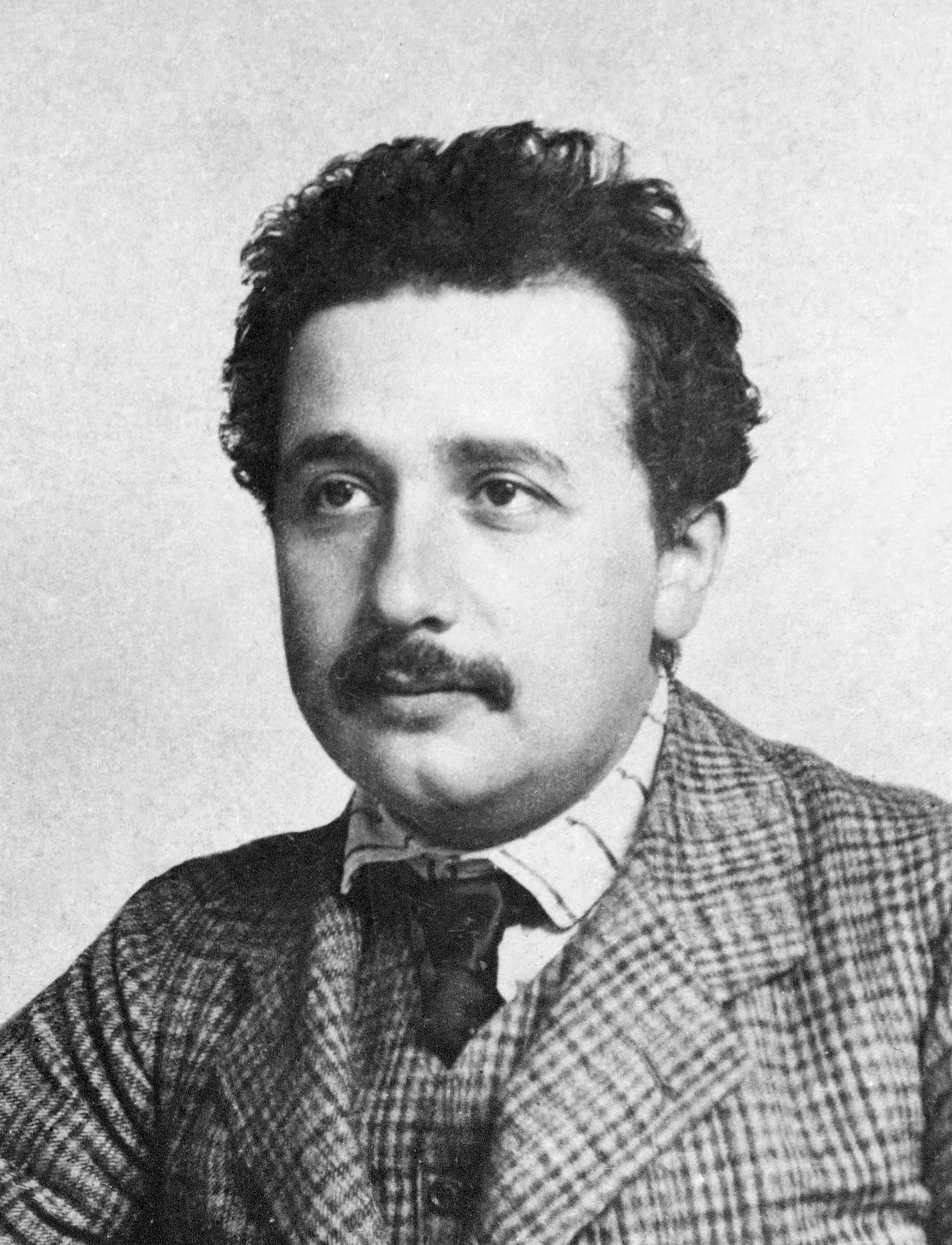
May 7, 1909: University of Zurich offers patent inspector Albert Einstein full-time job as a professor

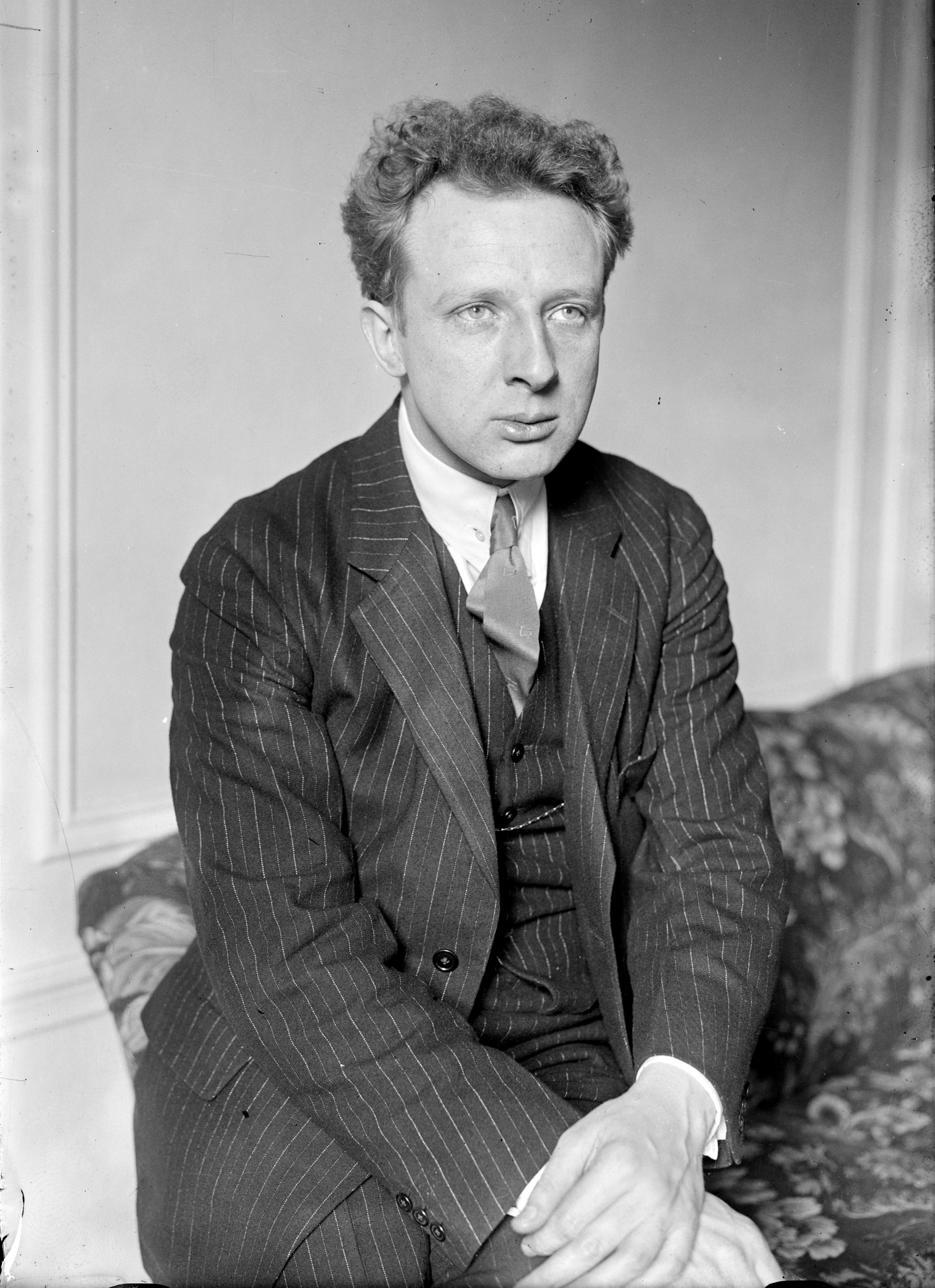
May 12, 1909: Leopold Stokowski makes debut as conductor

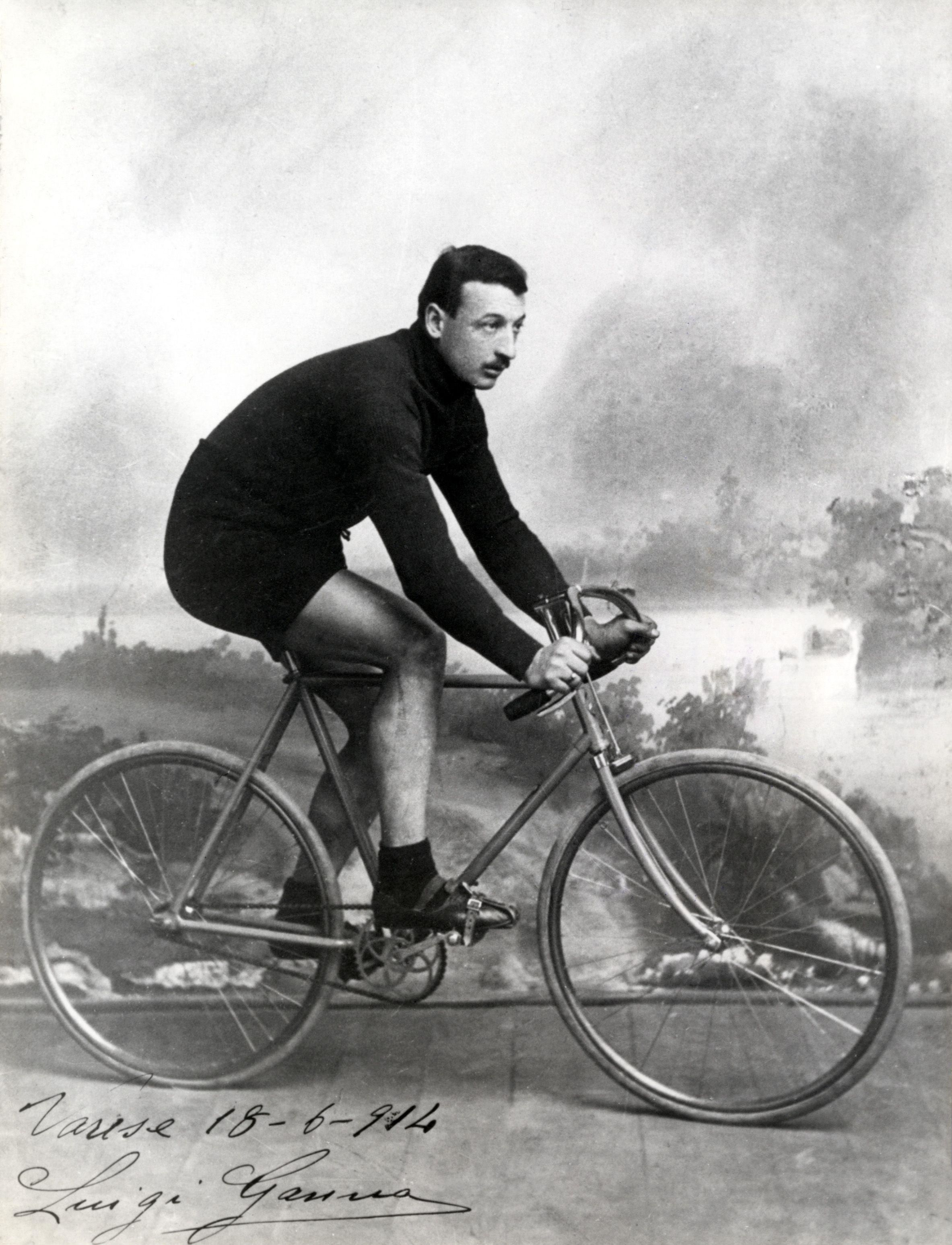
May 13, 1909: Luigi Ganna wins the first Giro d'Italia

The following events occurred in May 1909:

== May 1, 1909 (Saturday) ==
- Walter Reed Medical Center opened for treatment of Washington, D.C., residents and veterans.
- Tens of thousands of California residents turned out at San Francisco to greet the visiting Japanese ships IJN Aso and Soya, which had been captured from Russia during the Russo-Japanese War of 1905.

== May 2, 1909 (Sunday) ==
- Mark Twain began work on the "Ashcroft-Lyon" manuscript, never published, three weeks after firing his secretary, Isabel Lyon, who had married Ralph Ashcroft.
- Manuel Amador Guerrero, the first President of Panama and founder of the nation, died a few months after the expiration of his term of office. Fort Amador, which defends the Pacific side of the canal along with Fort Grant, was named in his honor.

== May 3, 1909 (Monday) ==
- Jesús Malverde, "El Rey de Sinaloa", was killed in Mexico and made his way into local folklore.
- Ensign Chester Nimitz began a career in submarine warfare, taking command of the USS Plunger.
- The Preakness Stakes, second jewel of the Triple Crown of American horseracing, returned to Maryland and the Pimlico racetrack, after having been run since 1890 in New York.

== May 4, 1909 (Tuesday) ==
- Tony Malfeti's body was found; he had been kidnapped on March 14.
- In New Knoxville, Ohio, 29-year-old butcher Martin Engel, the grandfather of future astronaut Neil Armstrong, died of tuberculosis. His wife and his nearly two-year-old daughter, Viola Louise Engel, Neil Armstrong's future mother, were at his bedside.
- In Las Cruces, New Mexico, Wayne Brazel was acquitted of the February 29, 1908, murder of Pat Garrett. The trial had begun on April 19, and the jury took 15 minutes to reach the verdict that Brazel, who fired his shot while Garrett was urinating, had acted in self-defense.

== May 5, 1909 (Wednesday) ==
- A change in the electoral law of the German free state of Saxony took effect, providing for four different classes of voters. All taxpaying men, 25 or older, had one vote, and men with higher incomes had two, three or four votes. Men received an additional vote upon turning 50.
- Jackson County, Colorado, was created from the western section of Larimer County.

== May 6, 1909 (Thursday) ==
- The U.S. Senate ratified a treaty that had been signed in December 1904, between the United States and Russia, providing legal recognition by each nation of the corporations of the other. Prior to the signing of the agreement, American business corporations had had no legal standing in the Russian Empire.
- Born: Loyd Sigmon, inventor of the "Sig Alert", in Stigler, Oklahoma (d. 2004)

== May 7, 1909 (Friday) ==
- The Pontifical Biblical Institute was founded in Rome by Pope Pius X.
- Albert Einstein was invited by the University of Zurich to accept the newly created chair in Theoretical Physics. He accepted, giving up his job at the patent office in Bern.
- Born: Edwin H. Land, American inventor of Polaroid instant camera, in Bridgeport; (d. 1991)
- Died: Alexis Toth, 56, leader of the Russian Orthodox in the United States

== May 8, 1909 (Saturday) ==
- The comedy film cliché of "a pie in the face" was introduced with the release of Broncho Billy Anderson's 4-minute silent movie Mr. Flip, and the title character, played by Ben Turpin, being the first recipient for harassing a waitress. The act would be perfected in longer films on May 1, 1913, with Mack Sennett's That Ragtime Band, with comedienne Mabel Normand being "pied" or throwing a pie.
- Herbert Lang and James P. Chapin set off on the ship SS Zeeland on the first project to catalog the plant and animal species of Central Africa. The Congo Expedition of the American Museum of Natural History would yield thousands of specimens.
- The town of Concrete, Washington, was incorporated as a merger of the communities of Baker (which had the Superior Portland Cement Company) and Cement City (which Washington Portland Cement Company). The town was featured in the 1993 Robert De Niro and Leonardo DiCaprio film This Boy's Life.
- The Bhawal case began when the Bhawal Sanyasi, kumar (prince) of the Bhawal Estate in Bengal, reportedly died at about 7 pm at the "Step aside" building in Darjeeling, where he had traveled for medical treatment. A body was cremated, and the controversy over whether the prince had actually died began. Ultimately, there would be three long court cases and, ultimately the Privy Council in London upheld the theory that the kumar Ramendranath Roy had not actually died, but had been in a coma and had ultimately been revived.

== May 9, 1909 (Sunday) ==
- Japanese sugar plantation workers in Hawaii walked out on strike, after five months of trying to get wages comparable to those paid to Portuguese and Puerto Rican laborers for the same work. By June, 7,000 had walked off the job. After five months, the plantation owners relented and brought the Asian workers' pay up to par.

== May 10, 1909 (Monday) ==
- The American Society for Clinical Investigation (ASCI) was founded by fifteen physicians who gathered at the New Willard Hotel in Washington, D.C., to identify and honor outstanding physicians engaged in biomedical research.
- Born: Maybelle Carter, American country musician, in Scott County, Virginia (d. 1978)
- Died: Futabatei Shimei, 45, Japanese novelist (The Drifting Cloud)

== May 11, 1909 (Tuesday) ==
- U.S. Design Patent No. 39,984 was awarded to Harrison D. McFaddin for the "banker's lamp"

== May 12, 1909 (Wednesday) ==
- Leopold Stokowski made his debut as a conductor, for the Colonne Orchestra in Paris.
- In South Bethlehem, New York, at least twenty employees of the Callanan Road Improvement Company (including the company's vice-president) were killed by the premature explosion of 1,000 pounds (450 kg) of dynamite as they were preparing to shoot inside a quarry.

== May 13, 1909 (Thursday) ==
- The first Giro d'Italia, Italy's premiere bicycle race, began at 2:53 in the morning in Milan with 127 starters. On May 30, Luigi Ganna was the first of the 49 remaining riders to return to Milan for the win.
- The British platinum producer Lonmin was incorporated as the London and Rhodesian Mining and Land Co., Ltd.

== May 14, 1909 (Friday) ==
- The "Milwaukee Road" railroad (C M & S) became the sixth transcontinental railroad in the United States, with the completion of $60,000,000 five-year Pacific Extension project to take the line to Seattle. With the driving of the final spike near Garrison, Montana, the official name of the Milwaukee Road became the Chicago, Milwaukee, St. Paul and Pacific Railroad.

== May 15, 1909 (Saturday) ==
- Saint Paulinus of Nola (354–431 AD) returned to his home in Nola, in Southern Italy, after nearly a millennium. His body had been at the Tiber Island in Rome since the 11th century. Paulinus was reinterred at the cathedral that had been dedicated there a week earlier.
- Born: James Mason, English-born film actor, in Huddersfield (d. 1984)

== May 16, 1909 (Sunday) ==
- Harper B. Lee, the first gringo (American-born) bullfighter, made his first appearance in Mexico City's Plaza el Toreo.
- A hailstorm in Uvalde County, Texas, caused major damage, but not as seriously as reported in some papers. The hailstones, some weighing as much as 6 pounds (2.7 kg), were heavy enough to kill several cows. A San Antonio paper reported that "Damage in the amount of at least $10,000 was done in Uvalde and five or six head of stock were killed," and added "The report that several Mexicans had been killed by hail stones is not correct." Dispatches from Galveston greatly exaggerated the damage in the rest of the nation. The New York Times reported that the hailstones "are said to have measured nearly a foot and a half in circumference and ranged in weight from seven to ten pounds", and that "eight lives are reported lost, while the number of live stock killed is reported anywhere from 500 to 2,000 dead ... loss to crops and farm property will aggregate between $200,000 and $300,000. The hailstones piled up in some places four feet high." The New York Herald said that the hailstones killed rancher James Carpenter "and seven Mexican hired men".

== May 17, 1909 (Monday) ==
- First Lady Nellie Taft, wife of U.S. President William Taft, suffered a stroke while at the White House, impairing her speech abilities. She recovered after one year.
- The United States Supreme Court ruled in the case of Welch v. Swasey, 214 U.S. 191 (1909), that it upheld the right of governments to set limits on the height of buildings.
- Born: Julius Sumner Miller, pioneer of the television science program, in Billerica, Massachusetts (d. 1987)

== May 18, 1909 (Tuesday) ==
- In Germany, patent No. 226,239 was awarded to Heinrich Hoerlein of the Bayer company for a sulfanilamide, the first synthesized sulfonamide. It was not until 1935 that the antibiotic properties of sulfonamides were realized, and the first sulfa drugs created.
- Menelik II, Emperor of Ethiopia, resolved the question of who would succeed him, selecting his 14-year-old grandson Lij Iyasu as the heir apparent. Iyasu V reigned from 1913 to 1916, but was deposed in favor of Menelik's daughter Zauditu.
- Born: Fred Perry, English tennis player (No. 1 ranked 1934–38), in Stockport (d. 1995)
- Died: Isaac Albéniz, 48, Spanish composer

== May 19, 1909 (Wednesday) ==
- With 55 dancers, including Vaslav Nijinsky, the Ballets Russes opened a new era in ballet dancing, bringing the Russian ballet to the Western world. Produced by Sergei Diaghilev, the tour opened at the Théâtre du Châtelet in Paris.
- A. Lawrence Lowell succeeded Charles William Eliot as President of Harvard University. In his 24 years, Lowell reformed the degree requirements to introduce the concept of selecting an academic major as a primary field of study, saying "The best type of liberal education in our complex modern world aims at producing men who know a little of everything and something well."
- Born: Sir Nicholas Winton, British who rescued more than 600 Czechoslovak children in World War II (d. 2015)

== May 20, 1909 (Thursday) ==
- Saint Clement Hofbauer (1751–1820), a prominent leader of the Redemption movement, was canonized. He is now considered the Patron Saint of Vienna

== May 21, 1909 (Friday) ==
- St. Cloud, Florida, created as a community for retired Union veterans of the American Civil War, received its first resident, Albert Hantsch of Chicago. By 2009, the population of St. Cloud passed 25,000.
- Born: Guy de Rothschild, French billionaire and banker, in Paris (d. 2007)

== May 22, 1909 (Saturday) ==
- Nearly 700,000 acres (roughly 1,100 square miles or 2,800 square kilometers) of federally owned land in Washington, Montana and Idaho were opened for settlement by executive order of U.S. President William Howard Taft.

== May 23, 1909 (Sunday) ==
- The Daily Bioscope theatre opened, introducing the British public to newsreels, the first showing of filmed news stories.
- The equestrian statue of Tsar Alexander III astride a horse, sculpted by Paolo Troubetzkoy, was unveiled in St. Petersburg at Znamenskaya Square. After St. Petersburg was renamed Leningrad in 1924, the unpopular memorial was moved in 1937 to the backyard of the city museum. In 1994, with the city again called St. Petersburg, the statue was again moved, and placed in front of one of the Marble Palace.

== May 24, 1909 (Monday) ==
- Sweden became the first European nation to set aside land for national parks. The first nine established under jurisdiction of the Naturvårdsverket were Abisko, Ängsö, Garphyttan, Gotska Sandön, Hamra, Pieljekaise, Sarek, Stora Sjöfallet, and Sonfjället. May 24 is now annually commemorated as the European Day of Parks.
- Born: Wilbur Mills, controversial Arkansas Congressman 1939–1977, in Kensett, Arkansas (d. 1992)

== May 25, 1909 (Tuesday) ==
- The Indian Councils Act 1909 (9 Edw. 7. c. 4) was given royal assent after passing the British parliament. For the first time, the legislative councils for the various provinces of British India would include members elected by the Indians themselves. Formerly, all members had been appointed by the Crown. Additional seats on the provincial executive councils were created, opening the way for more Indian officeholders. The reforms of 1909 were the first step toward self-government in India.
- Died: Israel Greene, 85, who had led the United States Marines in the capture of abolitionist John Brown at Harpers Ferry, Virginia, on October 18, 1859, died at his farm near Mitchell, South Dakota.

== May 26, 1909 (Wednesday) ==
- In The Derby at Epsom Downs Racecourse in Britain, Minoru, the horse owned by King Edward VII won after the betting favorite, American-bred Sir Martin, threw his jockey.
- Born:
  - Adolfo López Mateos, President of Mexico 1958–1964, in Atizapán de Zaragoza (now called Ciudad López Mateos); (d. 1969)
  - Sir Matt Busby, Scottish football manager (Manchester United), in Bellshill (d. 1994)

== May 27, 1909 (Thursday) ==
- A meteor crashed through the roof of a house in Shepard, Texas.
- The Indian Institute of Science was founded as a research university in the city of Bangalore in what is now the state of Karnataka, more than four years after the death of its chief benefactor, factory owner Jamsetji Tata.
- Born:
  - Juan Vicente Pérez, Venezuelan supercentenarian who was the oldest living man in the world (d. 2024)
  - W.W. Hansen, physicist and pioneer in microwave electronics; in Fresno (d. 1949)

== May 28, 1909 (Friday) ==
- The 1912 Summer Olympics were awarded by the IOC by acclamation to Stockholm, at a meeting in Berlin.

== May 29, 1909 (Saturday) ==
- Augusto B. Leguía, the President of Peru, was briefly taken hostage during an attempted coup, but rescued by loyal troops. The uprising had begun four days earlier when an anti-Chinese rally of the Workers' Party degenerated into a riot in Lima. As a concession to the rioters, President Leguia halted Chinese immigration to Peru, admitting only those immigrants who had at least 500 pounds sterling in resources.
- The first sale of an airplane to a non-military buyer took place when the G.H. Curtiss Manufacturing Co. delivered its Curtiss No. 1, nicknamed the Golden Flyer, to the New York Aeronautical Society to complete a $5,000 purchase.

== May 30, 1909 (Sunday) ==
- Sri Aurobindo delivered what his followers would later call the "Uttarpara Speech", in the West Bengal city of that name.
- For the first time, an airship remained aloft for more than 24 hours. Zeppelin II, with ten on board, flew 400 miles (640 km) from Friedrichshafen to Bitterfeld.

== May 31, 1909 (Monday) ==
- The National Negro Conference, chaired by Charles Edward Russell and attended by 300 people, convened in New York City at the United Charities building, then moved for an afternoon session to Cooper Union with 1,500 attending. From the meeting emerged the National Negro Committee, which would be renamed the following year as the NAACP. As one historian would later note, "The events at the conference set the tone for future race relations within the [NAACP] movement for decades to come."
- Born: Benny Goodman, American musician and 1940s pop star known as "The King of Swing", in Chicago (d. 1986)
