= March 1909 =

Month in 1909

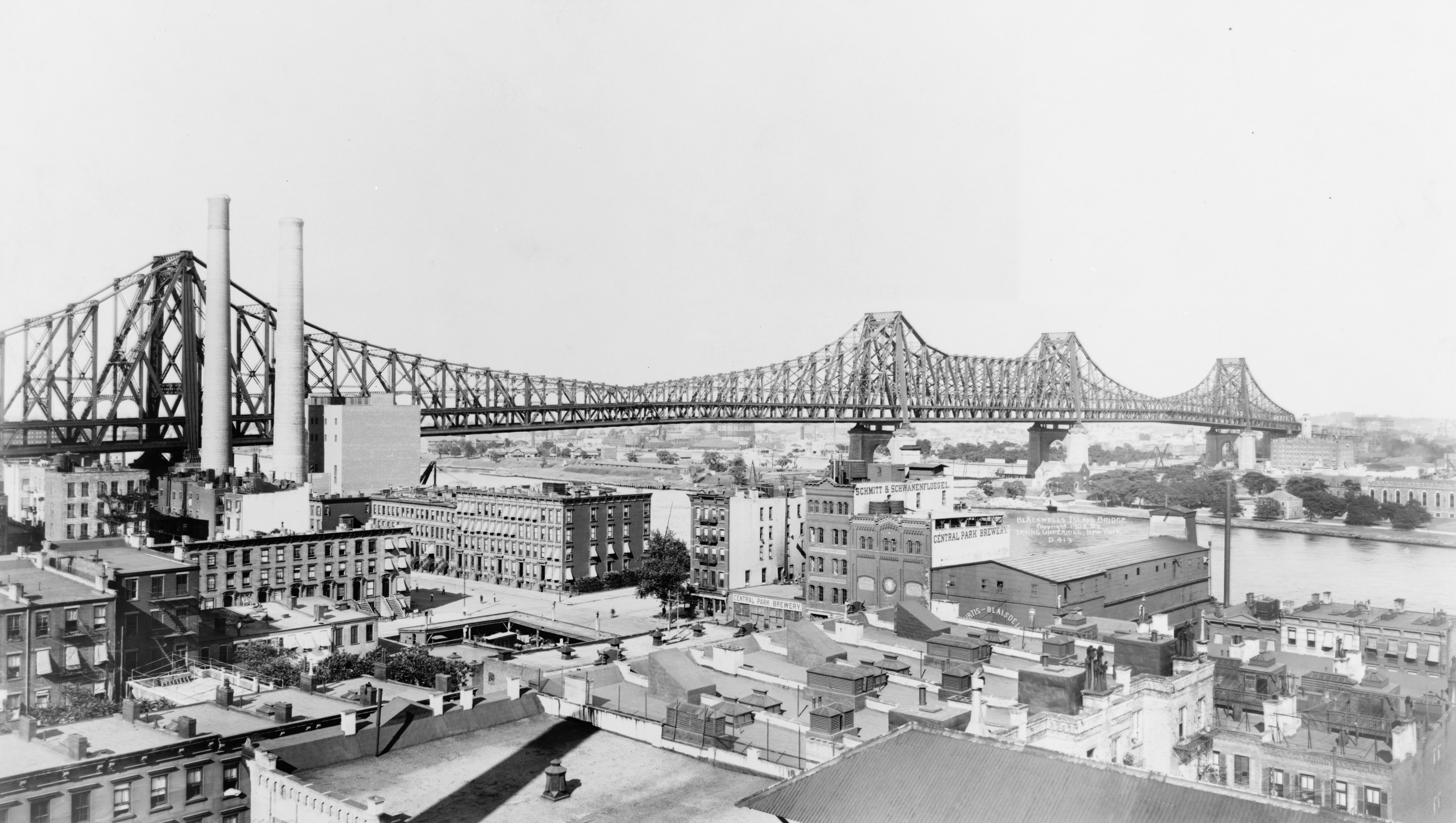
March 30, 1909: Queensboro Bridge opens to traffic in New York City

<<	March 1909					>>
Su	Mo	Tu	We	Th	Fr	Sa
	1	2	3	4	5	6
7	8	9	10	11	12	13
14	15	16	17	18	19	20
21	22	23	24	25	26	27
28	29	30	31

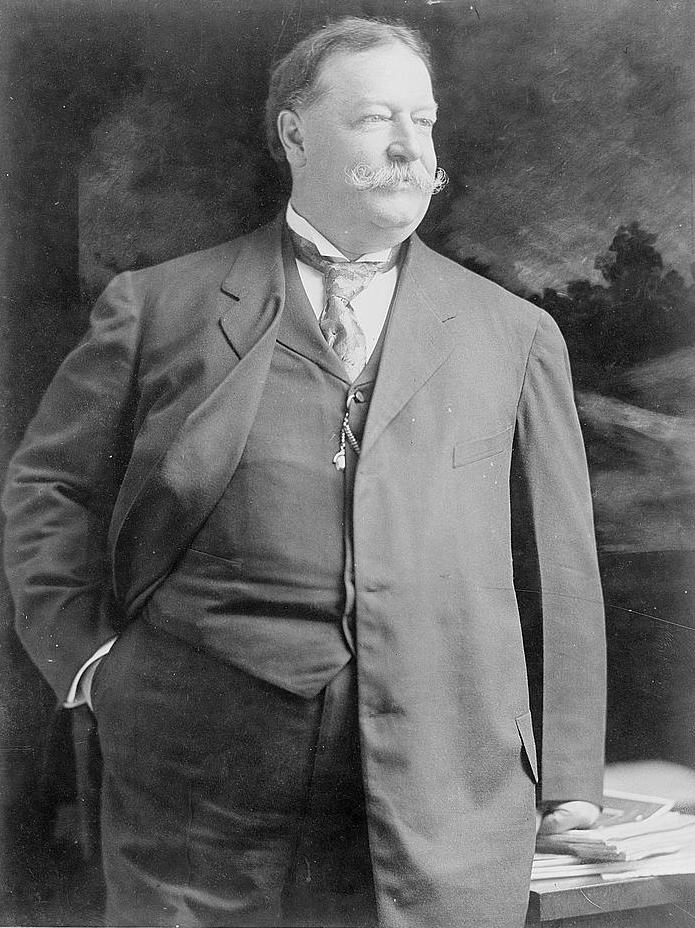
March 4, 1909: William Taft sworn in as 27th President of the United States

The following events occurred in March 1909:

== March 1, 1909 (Monday) ==
- Robert Peary, Matthew Henson, Ootah, Egingwah, Seegloo and Ookeah; and 18 other men set off from Ellesmere Island at 6:00 a.m. for their final push to the North Pole.

== March 2, 1909 (Tuesday) ==
- The United States Congress passed an act that provided no new ambassadorships would be permitted except by act of Congress. While the U.S. had ministers at legations in many countries, its only embassies at the time were in Austria-Hungary, Brazil, Japan and Turkey.
- With two days left in his term, President Roosevelt extended federal protection over the Zuni National Forest.
- Corson County, South Dakota, was founded.
- Born: Mel Ott, Hall of Fame baseball player who hit 511 home runs between 1926 and 1947; in Gretna, Louisiana (died in auto accident, 1958)

== March 3, 1909 (Wednesday) ==
- The U.S. Food and Drug Administration approved the use of sodium benzoate as a preservative in foods, in its Decision 104, in spite of a ban recommended on July 20, 1908.
- On his last full day in office, President Roosevelt signed into law a bill creating the 600,000 acre Mount Olympus National Monument in Washington State.
- President Roosevelt's Executive Order 969 directed that the U.S. Marines would be limited to shipboard duty with tasks determined by the ships' commanding officers. The unpopular change in the Marines' status was rescinded by President Taft on March 26.

== March 4, 1909 (Thursday) ==
- William Howard Taft was inaugurated as the 27th President of the United States. Because of a snowstorm, Taft took the oath indoors, becoming the first American president to do so since Andrew Jackson.
- Born: Harry Helmsley, American real estate entrepreneur, who began as an office boy and worked his way up to being a billionaire; in the Bronx, New York (d. 1997)

== March 5, 1909 (Friday) ==
- The first person to violate New York City's new law banning smoking in its subways was arrested. Louis Funcke lit up two days after the new law took effect and was released with a reprimand.
- The charter of the Mutual Benefit Health and Accident Association, creating what is now referred to as the Mutual of Omaha insurance company, was signed in Omaha, Nebraska.

== March 6, 1909 (Saturday) ==
- The infamous SS General Slocum sank a second and last time. On June 15, 1904, the steamboat burned and then sank, killing 1,081 people. Nevertheless, the hull of the ship was raised and refitted as the Maryland, a barge. With a load of 500,000 bricks, the Maryland split in half and sank at New Brunswick, New Jersey, albeit without a loss of life.
- The Simplified Spelling Board released its list of 3,300 words that should be reformed.
- Born: Obafemi Awolowo, Nigerian politician and independence leader who served as premier of the British African colony's Western State (including Lagos) prior to the creation of the Republic of Nigeria; in Ikenne (d.1987)

== March 7, 1909 (Sunday) ==
- The United States Senate entered the automotive age with the inauguration of transportation by electric cars, running underground through a tunnel between the new Senate Office Building and the United States Capitol.

== March 8, 1909 (Monday) ==
- U.S. President William Howard Taft rescinded Theodore Roosevelt's executive orders closing the navy yards at New Orleans and Pensacola.
- In California, the new Bank Act was signed into law, to take effect on July 1. A loophole within the legislation gave the Bank of Italy an advantage in opening branch banks across the state, leading to its growth into the colossal Bank of America.

== March 9, 1909 (Tuesday) ==
- In Paris, the Chamber of Deputies of France voted 388 to 129 to enact an income tax law.
- The Salvadoran gunboat Presidente was allegedly attacked by three Nicaraguan naval vessels, including the Momotombo.
- Bennett County, Mellette County, and Todd County, South Dakota, were all founded. Lincoln County, Montana, was created separately on the same day.

== March 10, 1909 (Wednesday) ==
- The Kingdom of Siam (now Thailand) signed a treaty ceding the Malayan peninsular states of Kelantan, Trengganu, Perlis and Kedah to the British Empire.
- The Russian Imperial Army adopted an official field uniform, a greenish-grey, single-breasted cloth tunic with five buttons, which remained in use until the formation of the Soviet Union.
- Heavyweight boxing champion Jack Johnson, and challenger (and future film star) Victor McLaglen, fought to a draw in Vancouver, in an exhibition.
- Greenlee County, Arizona, was created from the eastern section of Graham County.
- Born: Gerard Croiset, Dutch psychic, in Laren (d. 1980)

== March 11, 1909 (Thursday) ==
- Saying "I have made mistakes and I have been indiscreet," Los Angeles Mayor Arthur C. Harper, who was facing a March 26 recall election amid accusations of corruption, resigned and asked that his name be removed from the ballot.
- In Havana, the wife of "a poor cigarmaker" gave birth to quadruplets. She was already the mother of 14 children. The new President of Cuba, José Miguel Gómez, pledged substantial assistance to the new family.
- The first airplane flight over the U.S. state of Washington took place, six years after the Wright Brothers' first flight, as Charles K. Hamilton piloted a Reims Racer over Seattle.
- Homer Sanders defeated A.C. Jellison in a gold medal competition held in Pittsburgh by the American Bowling Congress. Both men had bowled a perfect game in 1908, and a roll-off determined the better bowler.

== March 12, 1909 (Friday) ==
- In Denmark, women were allowed to vote for the first time, at least in municipal elections, and women candidates were on the ballot. All women at least 25 years old, or women of any age married to a registered voter, were allowed to participate.
- New York City Police Department Detective Joseph Petrosino, on assignment in Sicily to investigate ties between the Italian Mafia and New York gangsters, was gunned down in Palermo on his way to meet an informant. The incident, never solved, is still cited as a cautionary tale against meeting an informant alone.
- Three American warships, the Yorktown, the Dubuque and the Tacoma, were ordered to Nicaragua in response to a "warlike attitude" on the part of Nicaraguan President Zalaya, and an armored cruiser remained off the coast until the ships could arrive.

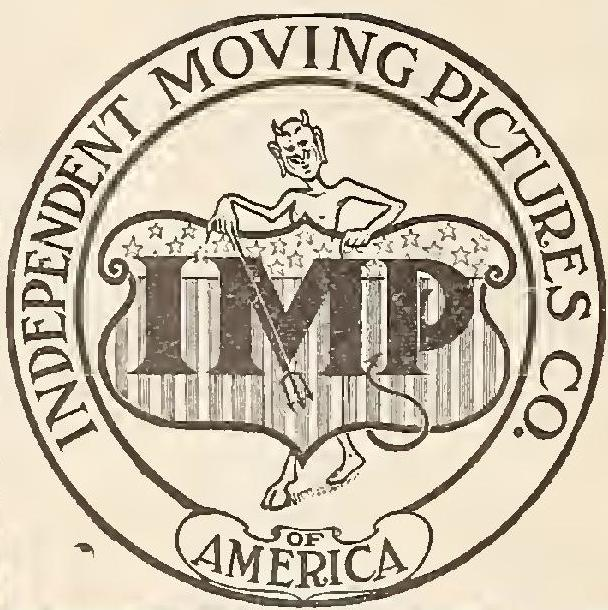

- Independent Moving Pictures (IMP) was founded by Carl Laemmle as a motion picture studio and production company based in Fort Lee, New Jersey. In 1912, it would merge with several other production companies to form Universal Film Manufacturing Company, later Universal Pictures, with Laemmle as president.

== March 13, 1909 (Saturday) ==
- In college basketball, the University of Chicago beat the University of Minnesota 20–15 to close an unbeaten (12–0) season. Several unsuccessful attempts were made to arrange a three-game championship series against Columbia University. Columbia had completed the 1908–09 season with a record of 16–1. Although there was no official champion, the Helms Athletic Foundation (in 1936) would retroactively list the Chicago Maroons as the national champion for the 1908–09 season.

== March 14, 1909 (Sunday) ==
- A 14-year-old boy in Tuxedo Park, New York, was killed when a 4,000-pound (1,800 kg) decorative balanced rock at the city park rolled over him.

== March 15, 1909 (Monday) ==
- The United States Congress met in a special session called by President Taft to consider the Payne Tariff Act. House Speaker Joe Cannon was re-elected for a fourth term, but 12 of his fellow Republicans voted against him.
- At 4:15, Edward Payson Weston, 71, set off from the New York Post Office building on a 4,300-mile (6,900 km) walk, hoping to become the first person to go from New York to San Francisco on foot. Delayed by blizzards, he missed his target of 100 days, arriving 105 days later in Los Angeles.
- Selfridges department store opened in London.

== March 16, 1909 (Tuesday) ==
- The creation of the United States Department of Justice's new Bureau of Investigation was announced by Attorney General George Wickersham. In 1934, the word "federal" was added to the name, creating the Federal Bureau of Investigation (FBI).
- The city of Lubbock, Texas (site of Texas Tech University) was incorporated.
- Died:
  - Henry Timken, 76, inventor of improved roller bearing, and founder of the Timken Company
  - Wilbraham Egerton, 1st Earl Egerton of Tatton, 77, chairman of the Manchester Ship Canal

== March 17, 1909 (Wednesday) ==
- The first concrete was poured as construction of the Panama Canal entered a new phase, beginning with the spillway at Gatun.
- Born Ken Anderson, American animator, storyboard artist and architect, in Seattle (d. 1993)

== March 18, 1909 (Thursday) ==
- Einar Dessau of Denmark spoke over a wireless radio transmitter to a government post 6 miles (9.7 km) distant, becoming, in effect, the first person to ever talk on the radio.
- Willie Whitla, the 8-year-old son of a leading attorney in Sharon, Pennsylvania, was kidnapped by two men who appeared at the East Ward School, and hours later a ransom note was received by his parents, demanding $10,000 and closing with the note, "Dead boys are not desirable". After the father delivered $10,000 to a woman at a drugstore, Willie was released unharmed and put on a streetcar in Cleveland, where he was reunited with his father at the city's Hollenden Hotel. James and Helen Boyle were arrested in Cleveland the next day, with $9,790 of the money. James Boyle was given a life sentence and died in prison. William Whitla died of pneumonia in 1932, at the age of 31.
- Born: Franklin Delano Roosevelt, Jr., who died 8 months later on November 8, 1909. Franklin and Eleanor Roosevelt's fifth child, also named Franklin Delano Roosevelt, Jr., would be born five years later.

== March 19, 1909 (Friday) ==
- The first airplane-manufacturing company was formed as Glenn Curtiss partnered with Augustus M. Herring to create the Herring-Curtiss Company. After parting ways with Herring the next year, Curtiss formed Curtiss Aeroplane Company, which later merged into Curtiss-Wright.
- In Germany, Zeppelin I ascended with 26 passengers and made the longest controlled airship flight to that time, for 90 minutes.
- Born: Louis Hayward, British film actor, in Johannesburg, South Africa (d. 1985)

== March 20, 1909 (Saturday) ==
- Colonel Duncan B. Cooper (referred to in many news accounts as D.B. Cooper) and his son Robin J. Cooper were both convicted of second degree murder in the death of former United States Senator Edward W. Carmack, and both sentenced to 20 years in prison. Senator Carmack, who represented Tennessee as a Congressman (1897–1901) and then as a Senator (1901–1907), had been shot and killed in Nashville on November 8, 1908. Colonel Cooper was pardoned on April 13, 1910, and lived until November 4, 1922. Robin Cooper was retried and acquitted in 1910. Almost nine years later, he was seen driving away from his home with a stranger, and found the next day by his car, dead from a fractured skull.

== March 21, 1909 (Sunday) ==
- The remains of The Báb (Muhammad Shirazi, 1819–1850), one of three central figures of the Baháʼí Faith, were interred in Haifa by `Abdu'l-Bahá, who had retrieved them from Persia.

== March 22, 1909 (Monday) ==
- The Austro-Hungarian Empire was massing its troops for an invasion of Kingdom of Serbia, over the issue of recognition of the Austrian annexation of neighboring Bosnia-Herzegovina. Russia, which had a treaty to defend Serbia, had protested the violation of the 1878 Treaty of Berlin. With Europe on the brink of war, Germany announced that if Russia did not drop its objections (and force Serbia to do the same), an Austrian invasion would follow.
- Born: Gabrielle Roy, Canadian author, in Saint Boniface, Manitoba (d. 1983)

== March 23, 1909 (Tuesday) ==
- Less than three weeks out of the White House, former U.S. President Theodore Roosevelt departed New York on the steamer Hamburg, bound for an African safari from which he would not return until June 16, 1910. The expedition was sponsored by the Smithsonian Institution.
- New York became the second state to make Columbus Day a legal holiday, to be celebrated on October 12 annually. Colorado had been the first, in a bill approved on April 1, 1907.

== March 24, 1909 (Wednesday) ==
- U.S. President William Howard Taft and the Attorney General gave their approval for the language of a proposed bill to create a federal income tax.
- Born: Clyde Barrow, legendary gangster (Bonnie and Clyde), in Ellis County, Texas, on a farm near the town of Telico. With Bonnie Parker, he would become a legendary bank robber, before being killed in a shootout in 1934.
- Died: John Millington Synge, Irish poet and author (b. 1871)

== March 25, 1909 (Thursday) ==
- Tsar Nicholas II of Russia averted war with Austria-Hungary and Germany, by dropping opposition to the Austrian annexation of Bosnia and Herzegovina, resolving the Balkan Crisis. War would break out five years later over Bosnia's neighbor, the Kingdom of Serbia.
- Crazy Snake Rebellion: Fighting broke out between members of the Creek Indian tribe and white deputies at Henryetta, Oklahoma, and within a few days, escalated into a rebellion reportedly involving several hundred Creeks under the leadership of Chief Crazy Snake. By March 28, at least six Whites had been killed and all companies of the Oklahoma state militia had been called out. The insurrection was the last American Indian uprising in the Indian Territory, which later became the State of Oklahoma.

== March 26, 1909 (Friday) ==
- A crowd of 10,000 demonstrated in Cairo, the day after British authorities in Egypt restored the 1881 "Law of Publications", barring newspapers from supporting nationalist causes.
- The National Board of Censorship, based in New York City, held its first meeting. On the first night, it reviewed 18,000 feet (5,500 m) of film for obscene or "crime for crime's sake" material. After six hours, 400 feet (120 m) were cut.
- Harvey Cushing performed his first trans-sphenoidal surgery in Boston, a superior nasal approach with omega-shaped incision.

== March 27, 1909 (Saturday) ==
- George, Crown Prince of Serbia, renounced his right to succession to the throne in favor of his younger brother, Alexander, who later became King of Yugoslavia.
- The first Chinese nationality law was proclaimed by the Imperial government, providing that all persons of Chinese nationality were citizens entitled to protection of the Empire's laws.
- Prince Karl Gunther of the German principality of Schwarsburg-Sondershausen (chief city Arnstadt) died, and was succeeded by Prince Gunther of Schawrzburg-Rudolstadt (capital Rudolstadt).
- Born: Golo Mann, German historian, in Munich (d. 1994)

== March 28, 1909 (Sunday) ==
- In a speech in Ottawa, Alexander Graham Bell announced that Canada had been the birthplace of the telephone. Bell told listeners that "The first transmission of speech over a wire was in the Autumn of 1876 on a line furnished by the Dominion Telegraph Co. of Canada between Brantford and Mount Pleasant." The transmission was only one way, however, with the first reciprocal conversation on the same line occurring later between Bell and Watson.

== March 29, 1909 (Monday) ==
- German Chancellor Bernhard von Bülow announced the doctrine of Nibelungentreue, the concept that the German and Austrian empires were united by their common language and heritage. Fighting on the same side in World War I, the two empires would fall together in 1918.

== March 30, 1909 (Tuesday) ==
- The Queensboro Bridge was opened to the public, linking Queens to Manhattan.

== March 31, 1909 (Wednesday) ==
- The first newsreel was shown in cinemas as Charles Pathé introduced the Pathé Faits Divers.
- Kansas became the first American state to prohibit use of the "common drinking cup" on trains and in railroad depots and public schools, with an order from the State Board of Health to take effect on September 1. Dr. Samuel Jay Crumbine, the Secretary of the Board, began lobbying for the ban after studies demonstrated that a tin cup (or water dipper), shared and drunk from by members of the public, was germ-infested and promoted the spread of disease. Sanitary, disposable paper cups were soon introduced, and the spread of disease was eliminated at the expense of creating the "throwaway society".
- The Serbian ambassador to Austria-Hungary formally presented his government's acceptance of the Austrian annexation of Bosnia. "Serbia undertakes to renounce from now onwards the attitude of protest and opposition which she has adopted with regard to the annexation since last autumn," announced the Ambassador. With those humiliating words, the Serbians averted an invasion by the Austrian Imperial forces.
- Hull No. 401, the keel of the RMS Titanic, the largest ship to that time was laid at the Harland and Wolff shipyards in Belfast. The ship would later become well known for her ill-fated maiden voyage.
- The American flag was lowered at Camp Columbia and the Cuban flag was hoisted, marking the withdrawal of all American troops from Cuba. The following morning at 10:00, the Sumner and the McClellan transported the remaining Americans home.
- Georgia ended its controversial "convict lease system", returning 1,200 imprisoned felons from private stockades to county jails. Until then, private companies had been paying the state for the use of the convicts' services.
