= February 1911 =

Month in 1911

<<	February 1911					>>
Su	Mo	Tu	We	Th	Fr	Sa
			1	2	3	4
5	6	7	8	9	10	11
12	13	14	15	16	17	18
19	20	21	22	23	24	25
26	27	28

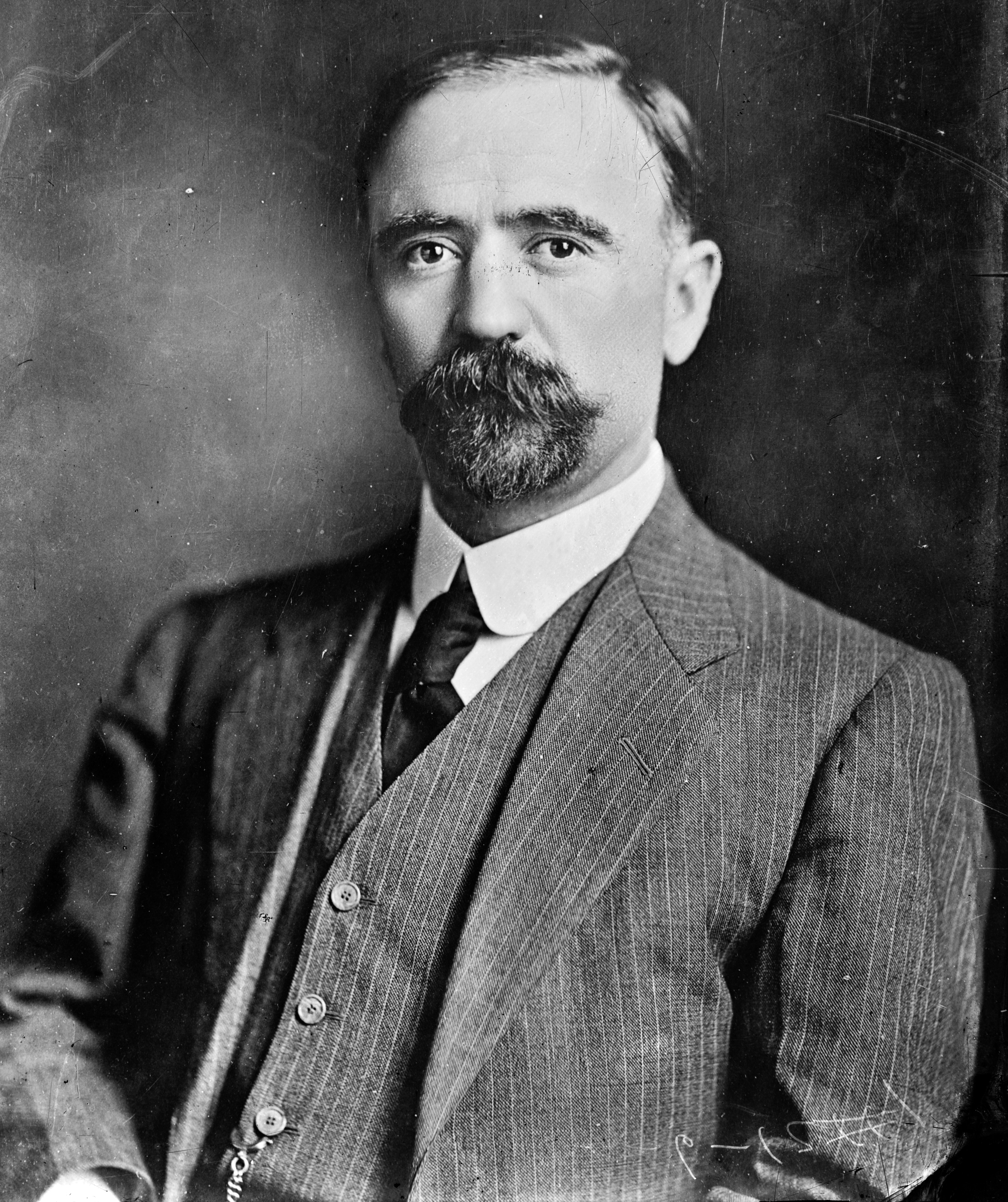
February 14, 1911: Rebel Mexican leader Francisco I. Madero avoids arrest, crosses into Mexico to fight President Porfirio Díaz

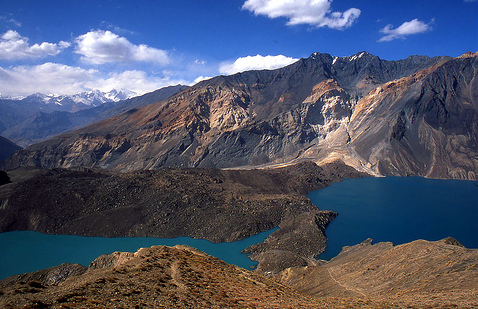
February 18, 1911: Earthquake in Tajikistan creates Usoi Dam, highest in the world

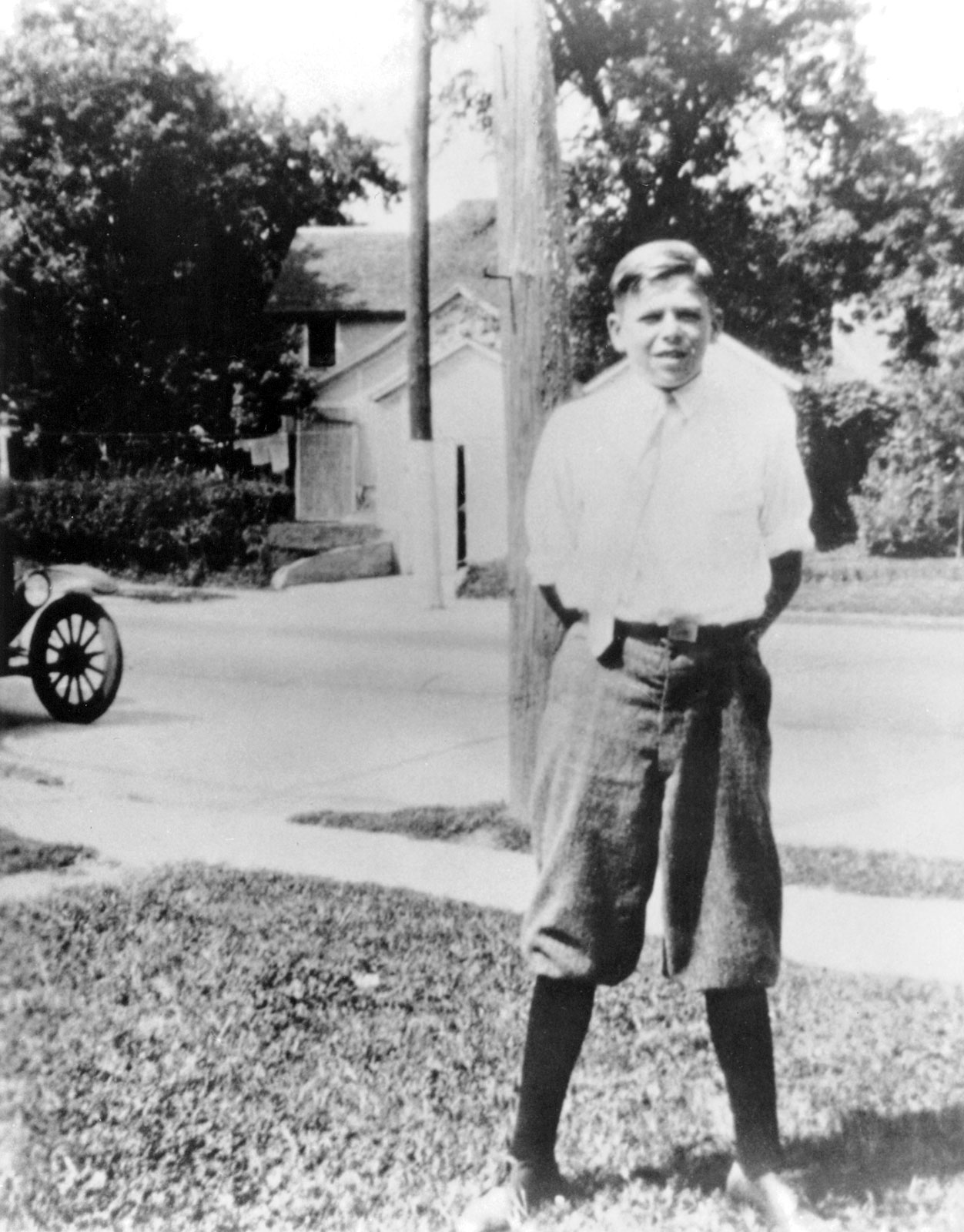
February 6, 1911: Future U.S. President Ronald Reagan born in Tampico, Illinois

The following events occurred in February 1911:

== February 1, 1911 (Wednesday) ==
- Thirty people were killed in an explosion at Communipaw, New Jersey. Employees of the Central Railroad of New Jersey had been unloading cases of black powder from the freighter Katherine W, when the accident happened at one minute past noon. The blast was felt 50 miles away, rocking office buildings and breaking windows in Manhattan, on the other side of the Hudson River. Eight officials of the railroad and the Du Pont Powder Company were indicted for the disaster.
- The Governor of the Isfahan province of Persia (now Iran) was shot. Mutemidi Khan and his nephew were murdered by a Russian national who had formerly been the chief of police in Isfahan.
- The British super-dreadnought, HMS Thunderer, was launched.
- Ziebach County, South Dakota, was established.
- Died: U.S. Navy Admiral Charles S. Sperry, 62, commander of the Great White Fleet expedition of 1907–1909.

== February 2, 1911 (Thursday) ==
- The crews of the two expeditions to the South Pole confronted each other at the Bay of Whales, as Robert Falcon Scott's Terra Nova sailed alongside Roald Amundsen's ship Fram. Word of Amundsen's arrival was sent back to Britain and then reported worldwide. When informed that the Norwegian explorer was racing him to the pole, Scott is said to have replied angrily: "By Jove, what a chance we have missed! We might have taken Amundsen and sent him back to his ship!"
- Captain Bellinger of the French Army set a new record for most persons to fly in an airplane, carrying seven passengers on a short flight at Pau.
- Revolution broke out on the northern coast of Haiti.
- The Honduras city of Puerto Cortez was turned over to the control of American and British soldiers.
- Born: Richard O'Kane, Medal of Honor winner for his heroism on the submarine USS Tang; in Dover, New Hampshire.

== February 3, 1911 (Friday) ==
- A group of 253 ice fishermen, who had set up a "fishing village" on an ice floe in the Bjorko Sound in Finland, were killed when a gale swept the settlement out into the Baltic Sea.
- George Grey, brother of the British Foreign Secretary, Sir Edward Grey, was killed by a lion while hunting in Nairobi.

== February 4, 1911 (Saturday) ==
- Persia's Minister of Finance, Sani al-Dowleh, was killed in Tehran by two Armenian assassins who were Russian subjects. The Russian legation provided the men sanctuary, and refused to turn them over for prosecution by Persia.
- Died:
  - General Piet Cronjé, 74, leader of the Boer resistance against Britain.
  - Owen Kildare, 46, crusader against slum poverty in New York.

== February 5, 1911 (Sunday) ==
- The revolution in Haiti was suppressed after the leader, General Montreuil Guillaume, was captured by government troops and shot. General Millionard was executed two days later.
- A bolt of lightning struck the dome of the Missouri State Capitol building in Jefferson City, setting a fire that destroyed the entire structure.
- Born: Jussi Björling, Swedish operatic tenor; in Borlänge. (d. 1960)

== February 6, 1911 (Monday) ==
- The Finnish ship Glenbank was wrecked off of the coast of Australia by a cyclone that killed 19 of her 22-member crew. The wreckage would be rediscovered more than 110 years later in 2022.
- The explosion of the Pluto Powder Company in Winthrop, Michigan, killed 10 workers.
- Born:
  - Ronald Reagan, 40th President of the United States (1981–1989), was born at 4:16 a.m. in Tampico, Illinois, to Nelle Reagan and shoe salesman Jack Reagan. (d. 2004)
  - William C. Beall, photographer for the Washington Daily News, who won a Pulitzer Prize for his image Faith and Confidence; in Washington, D.C.

== February 7, 1911 (Tuesday) ==
- Seattle Mayor Hiram C. Gill was put out of office by a recall election and replaced by George Dilling. It was the first city election in which women were allowed to participate, and the female vote was believed to have contributed to the recall.
- Bonneville County, Idaho, was established from the eastern portion of Bingham County.
- Born: Cornelius L. Reid, American singer; in Jersey City, New Jersey. (d. 2008)
- Died: Wallace Wattles, 50, American author and spiritualist, author of The Science of Getting Rich and The Science of Being Great.

== February 8, 1911 (Wednesday) ==
- The civil war in the Honduras ended after President Miguel R. Dávila and rebel leader General Manuel Bonilla agreed to an armistice that included free elections to be supervised by American observers. Bonilla would be elected president on October 29.
- Nasir al-Mulk assumed power as the new Regent for the 12-year-old Shah of Persia.
- Dedication of the Confederate monument in Tampa Florida at the Hillsborough County Courthouse on Franklin Street.
- Born: Elizabeth Bishop, U.S. Poet Laureate 1949–1950; in Worcester, Massachusetts. (d. 1979)
- Died: Frederick Campbell, 3rd Earl Cawdor, 64, British politician and former First Lord of the Admiralty for 8 months in 1905.

== February 9, 1911 (Thursday) ==
- The U.S. House of Representatives approved the Crumpacker Bill, increasing the number of U.S. Representatives, beginning in 1913, from 391 to 435, the number that it has had ever since. No state lost representatives, but 25 of the 46 states gained seats based on the 1910 census, and, pending statehood, Arizona and New Mexico were each given one representative. In later years, the number of 435 seats remained the same, but the distribution changed after each census.
- Voters in the Arizona Territory approved the proposed state Constitution by a margin of about 12,000 to 3,500.
- The Viscount Harcourt, British Secretary of State for the Colonies, ordered that the practice of indentured servitude for Chinese workers in British Malaya was abolished, effective June 30, 1914.
- Goshen County, Hot Springs County, Platte County, and Washakie County, Wyoming were all established on the same day.
- Died: Maharana Shri Ajitsinhji, the Maharaja of Dhrangadhra since 1900.

== February 10, 1911 (Friday) ==
- The French Chamber of Deputies passed a law reserving the use of the term "champagne" solely for white wine produced by vignerons or sold by négociants in the province of the Marne. The act outraged winemakers in other provinces of France and led to violent strikes.
- The Senate of France passed a bill setting clocks ahead by 9 minutes and 21 seconds in order to conform with the standard time in the United Kingdom, Spain, Belgium and the Netherlands.
- Mineral County, Nevada, was established.
- Died: Zerelda Samuel, 86, mother of Jesse James and Frank James.

== February 11, 1911 (Saturday) ==
- The Lincoln Memorial Commission was created to find an ideal site for the proposed Lincoln Memorial. On February 3, 1912, the west end of the Washington Mall would be picked, and the building would be dedicated on February 12, 1915.
- In Grand Rapids, Michigan, former President Theodore Roosevelt came out in favor of direct voting for U.S. Senators and for the Presidency. Though not a declared candidate, members of the crowd reportedly shouted "Teddy for President in 1912".
- Musselshell County, Montana, was established.

== February 12, 1911 (Sunday) ==
- Galatasaray SK achieved its highest Kıtalar Arası Derbi win beating Fenerbahçe SK 7–0 with only seven players on the pitch. Four goals were scored by Celal İbrahim, two by Emin Bülent Serdaroğlu and one goal was scored by Idris.
- Born:
  - Cearbhall Ó Dálaigh, 5th President of Ireland from (1974 to 1976); in Bray. (d. 1978)
  - Stephen H. Sholes, American record producer; in Washington, D.C. (d. 1968)
- Died: U.S. Army General Alexander S. Webb, 75, hero at Battle of Gettysburg, Medal of Honor recipient, and President of City College of New York (1869–1902).

== February 13, 1911 (Monday) ==
- Nicaragua's President Juan José Estrada declared martial law after an explosion in Managua destroyed a large quantity of arms and ammunition.
- Campbell County, Wyoming, was established.
- HNK Hajduk Split, winner of nine soccer football championships of the Yugoslav First League, and later six titles in the top Croatian league (Prva HNL), was founded in the centuries-old pub U Fleků in Prague.
- Born: Jean Muir, American actress; in New York City (d. 1996)

== February 14, 1911 (Tuesday) ==
- In a major turning point in the Mexican Revolution, Francisco I. Madero crossed the Rio Grande from Texas and into Mexico's Chihuahua State to take command of rebel forces. Madero had departed the United States after a warrant was issued for his arrest for violating U.S. neutrality laws.
- The House of Representatives approved the controversial reciprocal trade agreement between the United States and Canada, by a 221–92 margin.
- Niobrara County, Wyoming was established.
- Born: Willem J. Kolff, Dutch biophysicist who, in 1943, created the first machinery for kidney dialysis, and later patented the first artificial heart; at Leiden (d. 2009)

== February 15, 1911 (Wednesday) ==
- Jess Willard fought his first professional boxing bout, losing in the 10th round on a foul. Four years after the debacle in Sapulpa, Oklahoma, however, he became the world heavyweight boxing champion when he knocked out Jack Johnson, and held the title from 1915 to 1919 before losing to Jack Dempsey.
- U.S. Patent 1,368,974 was granted for a medicine that purported to be a remedy for the treatment of tuberculosis. Marketed as "Savrite", the ineffective but all natural compound was made up of olive oil, squill root, almonds, nettle and red poppy petals.
- Born: Leonard Woodcock, President of United Auto Workers and later the first U.S. Ambassador to the People's Republic of China; in Providence, Rhode Island (d. 2001)

== February 16, 1911 (Thursday) ==
- U.S. Representative William Stiles Bennet (R-New York), a member of the House Foreign Affairs Committee, introduced a resolution proposing that the United States annex Canada, after unsuccessfully opposing the reciprocal trade agreement. Although the proposal had no chance of passage, it had the intended effect of upsetting people in Canada and the United Kingdom, and President Taft asked the committee to put it to a quick vote. The measure failed in committee, 9–1, with Bennet being the lone supporter.

== February 17, 1911 (Friday) ==
- The basketball team of St. John's College beat the University of Rochester at home in New York City, 32–27, to finish the season unbeaten, at 14–0. The team, now St. John's University, won its games by an average of 20 points, with the exception of the Rochester win and a 25-23 squeaker over the powerful University of Pennsylvania on December 10. Although there was no national tournament at the time, the Helms Athletic Foundation retroactively named St. John's as the national college basketball champion.
- The city of Lakewood, Ohio, a suburb of Cleveland, was incorporated.

== February 18, 1911 (Saturday) ==
- A magnitude 7.4 earthquake created the highest dam in the world, the 567 meters (1,860 ft) Usoi Dam, across the Murghab River in what is now Tajikistan. The tremor and the subsequent damming of the river killed 90 people.
- The first air mail flight in history took place in India, when French pilot Henri Pequet carried 6,500 letters from Allahabad a distance of 8 miles, to the Naini junction. The mail was then loaded on a train and taken to Calcutta.
- Bill Miner, who had attained fame in the 19th century as a stagecoach robber, and then started a new career as a train robber upon his release from prison in 1901, committed his final holdup, taking $3,500 from a Southern Railroad Express train in Georgia. By then, Miner was 64 years old and "was barely able to hold his six-gun straight." On February 23, Pinkerton detectives would track him down to Lumpkin County, where he was arrested by the county sheriff. Miner would die in prison two years later.
- The Mark Twain Library, housing most of the works of Samuel Clemens, was opened in Redding, Connecticut. However, most of the collection would disappear over the years.
- Born: Merle Oberon, British actress; as Estelle Merle Thompson in Bombay, British India. (d. 1979)

== February 19, 1911 (Sunday) ==
- In a burst of inspiration, Austrian composer Arnold Schoenberg composed the first five of his famous "Sechs kleine Klavierstücke" ("6 Little Piano Pieces") in a single day, each of the pieces described as "miniatures... shorter and more concentrated than any others in the history of music".

== February 20, 1911 (Monday) ==
- To fight the bubonic plague epidemic in China, which had killed thousands of people, the imperial government ordered villages to burn their dead.
- Lincoln County, Wyoming, was established.

== February 21, 1911 (Tuesday) ==
- Japan, represented by its Ambassador Baron Uchida, and the United States (by Secretary of State Philander C. Knox) signed a Treaty of Commerce and Navigation at Washington. On July 26, 1939, the U.S. would give notice that it was exercising its rights to abrogate the treaty, and it expired six months later.
- Gustav Mahler conducted his final concert, guiding the New York Philharmonic Orchestra for the premiere of Busoni's Berceuse élégiaque. Mahler then returned to Vienna and died on May 18.

== February 22, 1911 (Wednesday) ==
- The Buffalo Germans, a barnstorming professional team billed as "world's champions at basketball", lost their first game in three years, after winning 111 consecutive games against various opponents. The streak was snapped by the 31st National Guard team of Herkimer, New York, in a 19–14 win at Utica.
- The vote on the first reading of the "Parliament Bill", which would give the House of Commons veto power over the House of Lords, passed 351 to 227. The third reading of the modified bill would later pass 362 to 241.
- Died: Frances Harper, 85, African-American author.

== February 23, 1911 (Thursday) ==
- The entire population of an unnamed village near Harbin, China, was found to have been killed by the bubonic plague.
- The Governor of the Chernihiv oblast Tchernigov province of Little Russia (now Ukraine) expelled 200 Jewish families and ordered them to depart, on foot, through heavy snow.
- Avery County, North Carolina was established.
- Born: G. Mennen Williams, American politician who served as Governor of Michigan from 1949 to 1961, later the Chief Justice of the Michigan Supreme Court from 1983 to 1987; in Detroit. (d. 1987)
- Died: Quanah Parker, 65, Principal Chief of the Comanche Nation since 1890.

== February 24, 1911 (Friday) ==
- The U.S. Senate ratified the commercial treaty that had been signed earlier in the week with Japan.
- Pope Pius X declared that the harem skirt, a new fashion out of Paris, received his strong disapproval. The statement, published in the Osservatore Romano, also said that wearers of the skirt would be excluded from Catholic churches.

== February 25, 1911 (Saturday) ==
- A group of tribal chiefs in Morocco met at Agourai, and agreed on the details for a planned assassination of Berber pasha Thami El Glaoui and Grand Vizier Muhammad al-Muqri, to take place at a gathering of the leaders on March 14.
- Victor Herbert's opera Natoma premiered at Philadelphia, then moved to New York's Metropolitan Opera House.
- In the only engagement of the Mexican Revolution where he would command the troops, Francisco I. Madero fought at the Battle of Casas Grandes. His rebel forces were routed by the government troops, and Madero himself was almost killed, after which he stayed away from the front.

== February 26, 1911 (Sunday) ==
- In what has been described as "the last massacre of Indians in the United States", a group of Nevada state police fought with "Shoshone Mike", who had killed four ranchers in Washoe County. "It was probably the first time in many years that bows and arrows have figured in any Indian fight," the New York Times noted. One of the white men died, while eight of twelve Shoshones, some of whom were children, were killed in the fight at Rabbit Creek, near Winnemucca. Remains believed to be those of the group were kept in a museum for years, then returned to the Shoshone tribe for burial in 1992.

== February 27, 1911 (Monday) ==
- The first electric starter for an automobile was unveiled, as inventor Charles F. Kettering, started the engine of a Cadillac in a few seconds, an alternative to the crank that had been used to start engines. The innovation, which depended on a 65-pound battery, was installed on 12,000 Cadillac automobiles in its first year, and Kettering would receive U.S. Patent #1,150,523 on August 17, 1915. "A few hours later, elated Cadillac engineers decided that since their cars were going to have a storgage battery and a generator, why not operate the ignition and headlights electrically also?"
- France's Prime Minister Aristide Briand resigned. He was replaced the next day by Ernest Monis.
- Clearwater County, Idaho, and Moffat County, Colorado, were established on the same day.

== February 28, 1911 (Tuesday) ==
- In a surprise action, President Taft nominated William H. Lewis, an African-American from Massachusetts, to be United States Assistant Attorney General. The U.S. Senate was near the end of its term, and did not take up the matter, and Lewis was sworn in while Congress was out of session.
- A proposed Seventeenth Amendment to the United States Constitution, providing for U.S. Senators to be elected by popular vote rather than by the state legislatures, was favored, 54 to 33 favor in the U.S. Senate, but fell five votes short of the necessary 2/3rds majority required by Article V of the United States Constitution. The amendment would eventually be sent to the states in 1912 and ratified the following year.
- Seventeen men were killed in a mine fire near Tonopah, Nevada, including rescuer "Big Bill" Murphy.
- Natoma, written by Victor Herbert, became the first U.S. written and produced opera to premiere at the Metropolitan Opera.
- Born: Bernd Scholz, German composer; in Neustadt, Upper Silesia, German Empire (now Prudnik, Poland) (d. 1969)
