= April 1911 =

Month in 1911

<<	April 1911					>>
Su	Mo	Tu	We	Th	Fr	Sa
						1
2	3	4	5	6	7	8
9	10	11	12	13	14	15
16	17	18	19	20	21	22
23	24	25	26	27	28	29
30

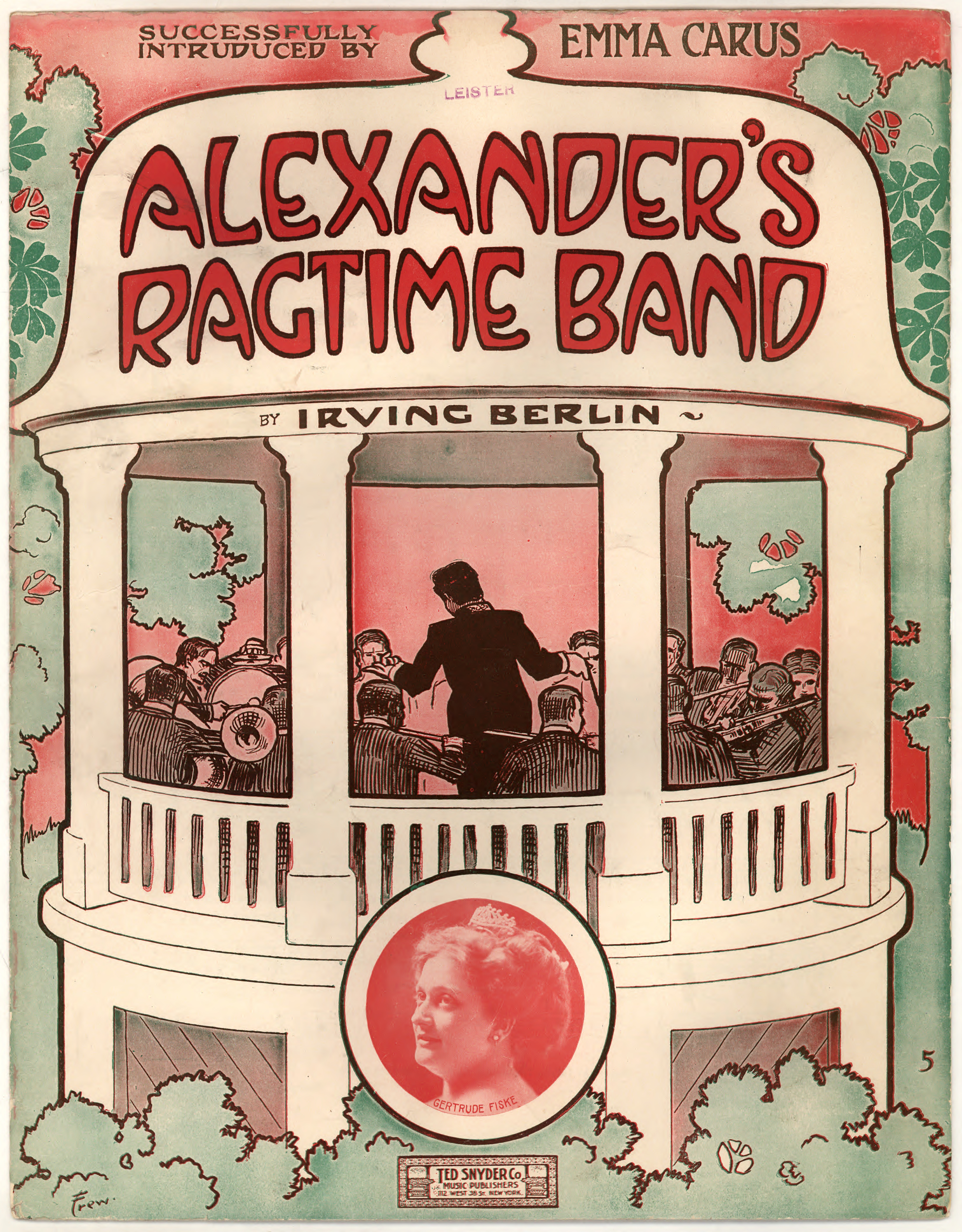
April 17, 1911: Top hit of 1911, "Alexander's Ragtime Band", introduced

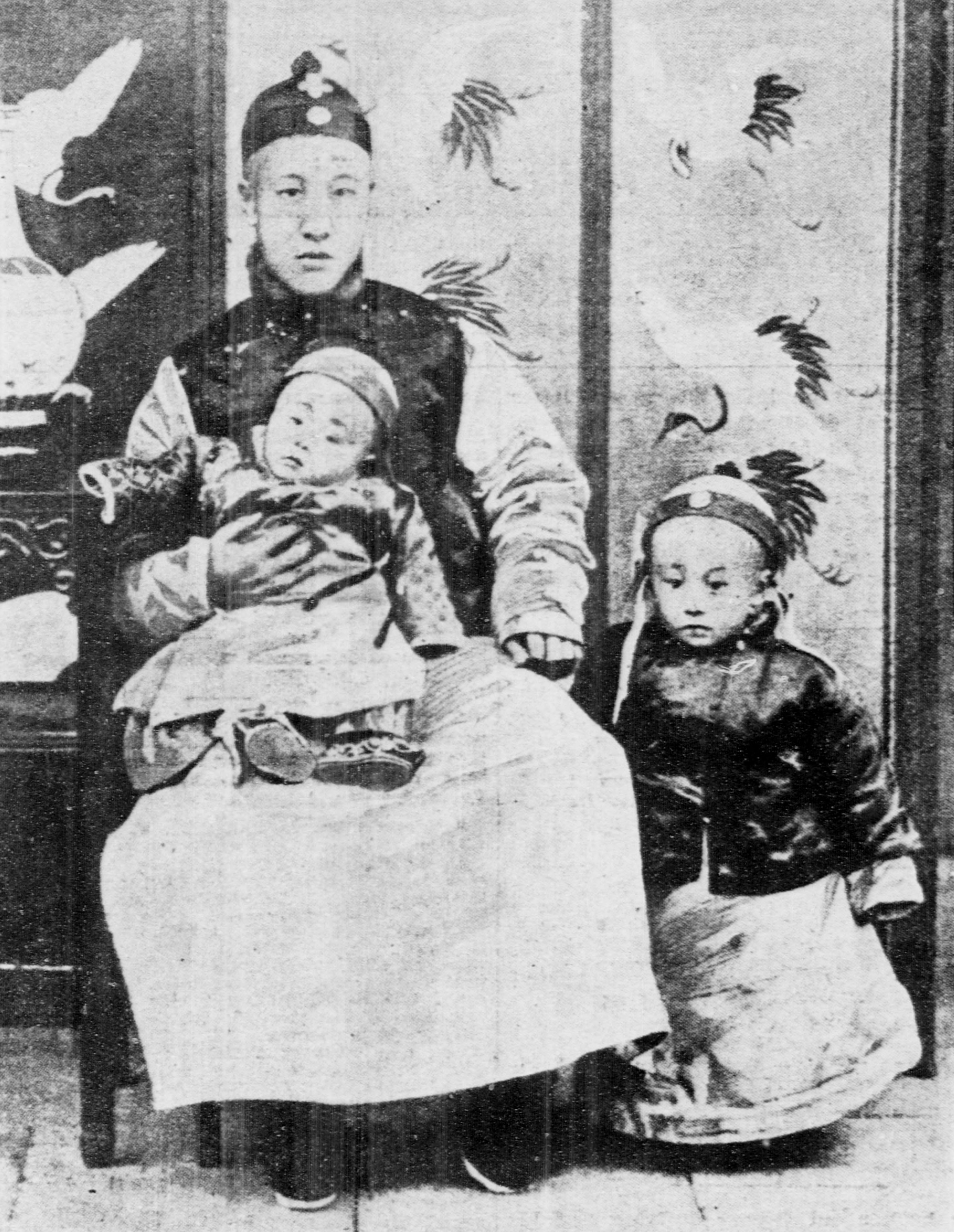
April 3, 1911: Zaifeng, Prince Chun, becomes China's regent for his 2-year-old son, Emperor Puyi (standing)

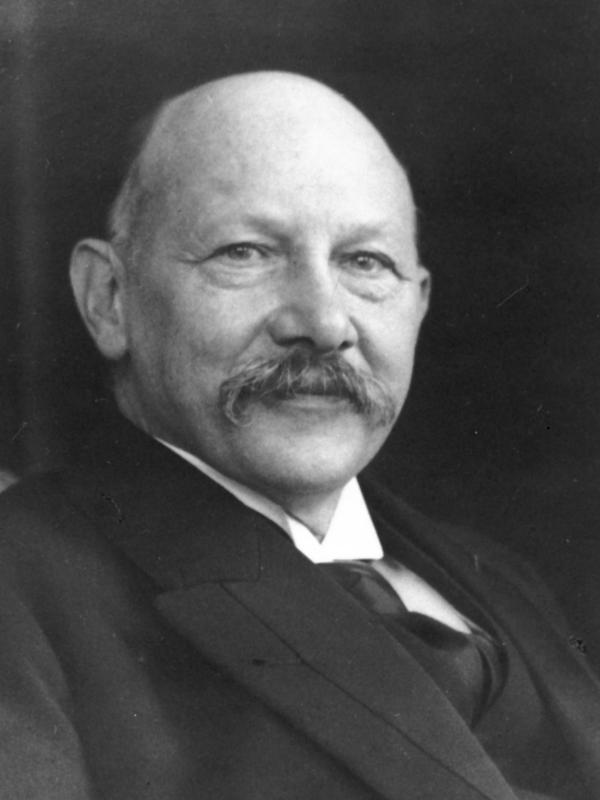
April 8, 1911: Dutch physicist Kamerlingh Onnes discovers principle of superconductivity

The following events occurred in April 1911:

== April 1, 1911 (Saturday) ==
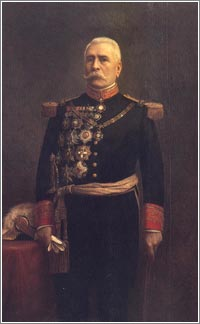
President Diaz

- With the nation in revolt, President Porfirio Díaz of Mexico opened the new session of the Congress of Mexico, outlining his plans for reform, including a one-term limit on presidents. The proposals came too late, and Díaz's 25 consecutive years in office ended the following month.
- Tsinghua University was opened in Beijing, with an enrollment of 468 students, as the Imperial Tsinghua Academy. The 325 enrolled in the "middle division" (zhongdeng ke) were taught by 20 Chinese professors, while 143 students in the advanced division were instructed by Americans.
- United Mine Workers of America President Thomas Lewis was defeated in his bid for re-election by John P. White.
- Born: Charles Coles, American tap dancer and actor, in Philadelphia (d. 1992).

== April 2, 1911 (Sunday) ==
- The United Kingdom census was taken, based on two acts of Parliament, one for Great Britain and the other for Ireland. "Schedules" with multiple questions were distributed to each household, and collected by enumerators the following day. The final count, released on June 16, was 45,216,665. One out of every seven employed persons was a domestic servant. Suffragette Emily Davison hid in a cupboard in the crypt of the Palace of Westminster so that she could legitimately be recorded as resident on census night at the House of Commons of the United Kingdom.
- The first Australian National Census (as opposed to prior colonial censuses) was taken, with information to be filled out on a "Householder's Card". The final count showed 4,455,005 people.
- British evangelist John Henry Jowett, celebrated at the time as "the greatest preacher in the English-speaking world," began a revival in New York City at the Fifth Avenue Presbyterian Church.

== April 3, 1911 (Monday) ==
- The first performance was given of the Fourth Symphony of Jean Sibelius.
- Draft registration became mandatory for all boys aged 14 to 20 in New Zealand.
- An imperial edict was issued in the name of the two-year-old Emperor of China, Puyi, proclaiming him to be supreme commander of the army and appointing his father, Prince Chun, to serve as Prince-Regent until the Emperor reached a majority.
- President Taft ordered the reassignment of the all-African-American U.S. 9th Cavalry to move them out of San Antonio, where they had been sent to guard the border with Mexico, after the regiment's northern-born soldiers had defied the Texas city's segregation laws. Reportedly, two white streetcar conductors had been beaten up after insisting that the soldiers move to the colored section of the cars. The order was reversed two days later after complaints came from the mayors of cities where the troops were to be moved, including Brownsville, Laredo and Del Rio.

== April 4, 1911 (Tuesday) ==
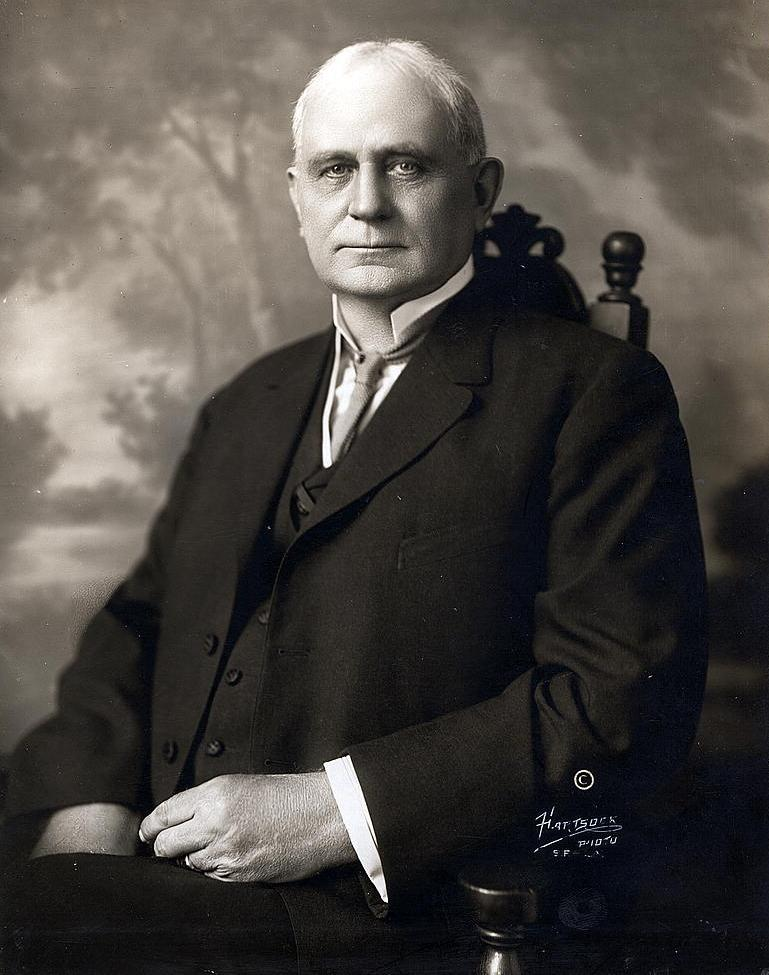
Speaker Clark

- As the 62nd United States Congress opened with a Democratic majority in the House, James Beauchamp "Champ" Clark was elected as the new Speaker of the House, succeeding Joseph G. Cannon. In a vote along party lines, Clark (D-Mo.) received 217 Democrat votes while James Mann (R-Ill.) received 131 Republican votes. New members took office, including Victor L. Berger, the first Socialist Party of America member to ever serve in Congress.
- Ratifications of the Japan-United States Treaty of Commerce and Navigation were exchanged at the Imperial Palace in Tokyo, as the Emperor Meiji, Prime Minister Katsura, and Foreign Minister Komura welcomed Ambassador O'Brien. The Emperor's greetings to U.S. President Taft were cabled by the ambassador, and Taft cabled a reply, with both leaders welcoming the extension of their nations' friendship.
- Born:
  - Stella Walsh, Polish athlete who won an Olympic medal in 1932 for the women's 100 meter dash and who was discovered after her death to have been a man; as Stanisława Walasiewicz in Wierzchownia (killed 1980).
  - Grover C. Nash, African-American pilot; in Dry Branch, Georgia (d. 1970).
  - Michael Woodruff, British surgeon and pioneer in organ transplantation; in London (d. 2001)
  - Pietro di Donato, American writer; in West Hoboken, New Jersey (d. 1992).
  - Freddie Miller, American boxer; in Cincinnati (d. 1962).
- Died: John S. Trower, 61, "reputed to have been the wealthiest negro in the United States" at the time of his death. Trower was born in Virginia, grew up in Germantown, Pennsylvania, and left a fortune of $1,500,000 (equivalent to $30,000,000 in 2011) after building a catering business.

== April 5, 1911 (Wednesday) ==
- In one of the largest union labor demonstrations in the United States to that time, a group of 120,000 employees and 230,000 citizens took the day off and marched in the rain along Fifth Avenue in New York City in a memorial service for the 146 victims of the Triangle Shirtwaist Factory fire that had happened on March 25. The procession lasted for three hours and was watched by 400,000 spectators.

== April 6, 1911 (Thursday) ==
- By a vote of 198–135, the U.S. House of Representatives changed its rules to remove much of the power that the Speaker of the House had formerly wielded. Never again would the Speaker have the exclusive right to assign members to committees or to select the chairmen.
- For the first time, the State Council of Imperial Russia approved an interpellation resolution criticizing the Tsarist government. The vote was 98–52 in favor of the measure, which rebuked Prime Minister Stolypin's proposal for self-government for Poland.
- Mayor of Baltimore J. Barry Mahool signed into law an ordinance prohibiting African-Americans from moving into, or establishing businesses, in white neighborhoods.
- Born: Feodor Lynen, German biochemist and 1964 Nobel Laureate; in Munich (d. 1979).

== April 7, 1911 (Friday) ==
- The U.S. Department of Justice won its first conviction in its prosecution of members of the Black Hand, for extortion and murder by dynamite in Chicago. Under tight security, a federal court jury convicted Gianni Alongi of employing the U.S. mail to send death threats to Garmila Marsala, who operated a butcher shop.
- A fire at the Price-Pancoast Colliery at Throop, Pennsylvania, near Scranton, Pennsylvania, killed 73 coal miners, many of them boys.
- Francisco I. Madero, Pancho Villa and Pascual Orozco led an army of 2,500 Mexican rebels on an attack on march toward Ciudad Juárez.

== April 8, 1911 (Saturday) ==
- Dutch physicist Heike Kamerlingh Onnes discovered superconductivity at the Leiden University, finding that the electrical resistance of the metal mercury completely disappeared at a temperature of 4.15 kelvins (−268.85 °C). The exact moment of his finding has been traced to the series of notebooks that he kept at the time, at 4:00 in the afternoon. Presentation of the results was made on April 28. For his discovery, Kamerlingh Onnes would be awarded the Nobel Prize in Physics in 1913.
- An explosion at the Banner Mine of Pratt Consolidated Coal Company, near Littleton, Alabama, killed 128 coal miners. All but five of them were African-Americans who had been convicted of minor crimes and were sentenced to hard labor.
- Elsie Paroubek, aged 5, vanished from the corner of 23rd Street and Troy Avenue in Chicago. The subsequent exhaustive search for her would preoccupy Illinois, Wisconsin and Minnesota law enforcement for six weeks. Her body would be discovered in a canal on May 9.
- Born:
  - Melvin Calvin, American chemist and 1961 Nobel laureate; in St. Paul, Minnesota (d. 1997).
  - Emil Cioran, Romanian philosopher; in Rășinari, Austria-Hungary (d. 1995).
  - Ichiro Fujiyama, Japanese musician; in Tokyo (d. 1993).

== April 9, 1911 (Sunday) ==
Inayat Khan

- The Sufi Inayat Khan introduced the music of India to the West with a recital at the Hindu temple in San Francisco, before going on further international tours.
- A fire in the Yoshiwara district of Tokyo, where geishas were housed for pleasure, killed 300 people, injured 800 and left 6,000 homeless.

== April 10, 1911 (Monday) ==
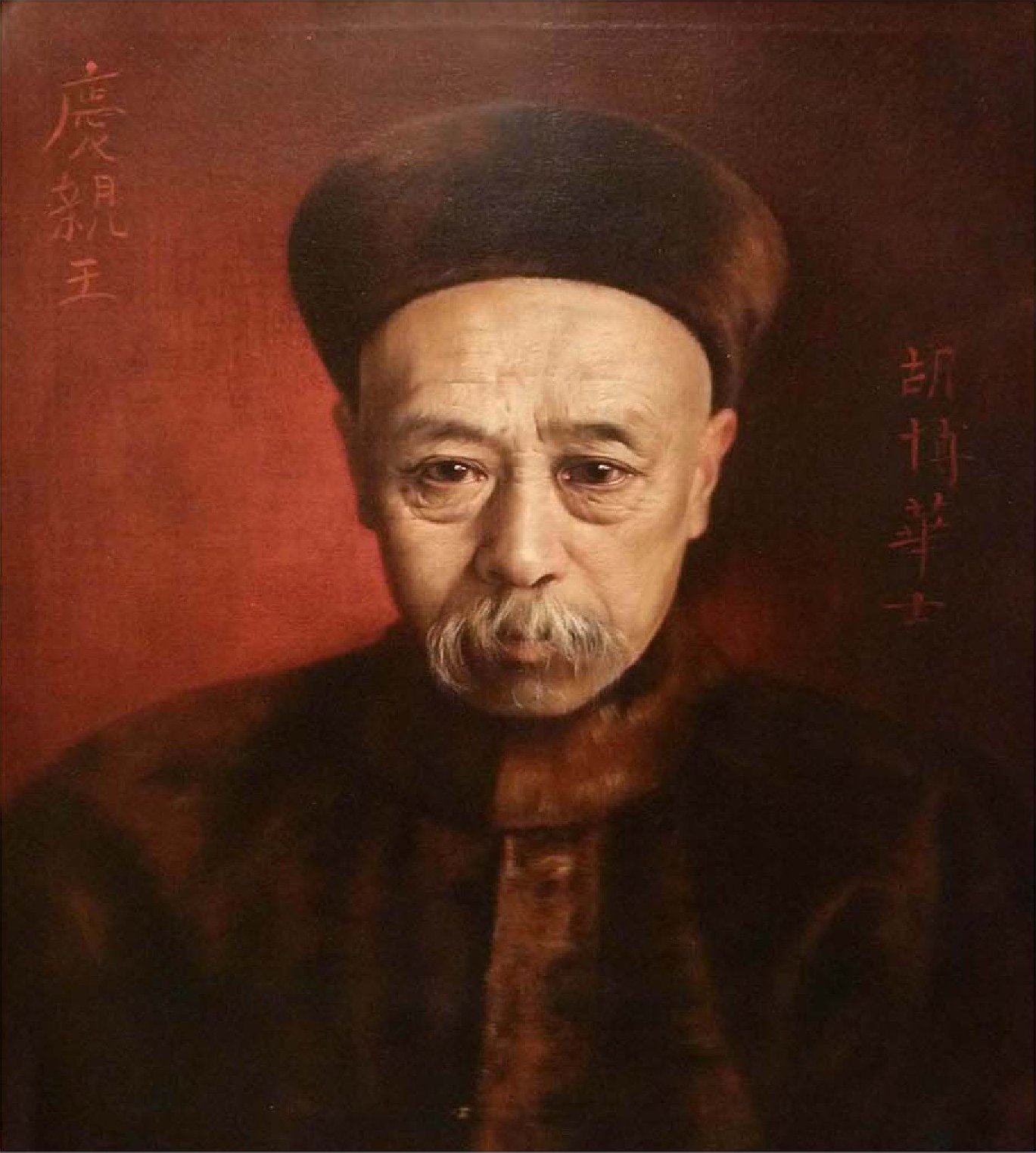
Premier Yikuang

- By an imperial decree that followed pressure by Chinese petitioners seeking a constitutional government, an "Imperial Cabinet" of Ministers was created to replace the royal family's Grand Council, and Yikuang (Prince Qing) was named to the new office of Premier of China. Though still dominated by the Manchu people, who occupied 8 of the 13 cabinet seats, room was made for four Chinese and one Mongol as ministers.
- The "twin paradox" was first proposed by French physicist Paul Langevin
- The steamer SS Iroquois capsized in the Strait of Georgia between Vancouver Island and the rest of British Columbia, killing 20 people. Eleven others were saved.
- Born: Maurice Schumann, French foreign minister 1969–1973; in Paris (d. 1998).
- Died:
  - Sam Loyd, 70, American creator of puzzles known as the "Puzzle King."
  - Ras Bitwaddad Tesemma, Regent for the Emperor of Ethiopia from 1909 to 1911.
  - Sir Alfred Comyn Lyall, 75, British historian.
  - Mikalojus Čiurlionis, 35, Lithuanian musical prodigy and composer; from pneumonia.

== April 11, 1911 (Tuesday) ==
- The Senate of France voted 213–62 in favor of a resolution supporting an end to territorial limitations on where the wine champagne could be produced and still be referred to by that name. Upset by the vote wine-growers in the Marne department rioted, burning establishments and dumping thousands of gallons of champagne. Order was restored by the end of the week
- In the closest parliamentary election in British history, at the race for the Exeter constituency, incumbent Liberal Henry Duke, 1st Baron Merrivale was found to have defeated Unionist Harold St Maur by a single vote. In December, St Maur appeared to have won by four votes, 4,786 to 4,782. Duke petitioned for a review and the court at first invalidated 14 ballots, finding that the two men had tied at 4,777 apiece. Another review followed, and Duke was found to have beaten St Maur, 4,777 to 4,776.
- Isaac Harris and Max Blanck, co-owners of the Triangle Waist Company, were indicted for manslaughter for the fire that killed 146 employees, with probable cause based upon the finding of a bolted door. Blanck and Harris would be acquitted following a trial in December. Civil suits against them would be settled on March 11, 1913, with payment of $75 apiece to the families of each of the deceased victims.
- Mae West, 17, married musician Frank Wallace; they separated after a few months, but never divorced, until after Wallace resurfaced in 1935.
- Born: Leon Mandrake, Canadian-born American magician; in New Westminster, British Columbia (d. 1993).
- Died: Crazy Snake, 64, real name Chito Harjo, Creek Indian warrior who had, on March 27, 1909, led the last American Indian uprising in the Indian Territory, later Oklahoma.

== April 12, 1911 (Wednesday) ==
- On the 50th anniversary of the start of the American Civil War, the very first graduate from the flying school of the United States Navy, Lt. Theodore G. Ellyson, became "Naval Aviator No. 1."
- Detectives arrested James McNamara and Oscar McNanigal in Detroit after a search of several months. The two had been among those indicted for the Los Angeles Times bombing, which had killed 21 people the previous October 1. James was carrying a briefcase filled with dynamite when caught. His brother John was caught ten days later in Indianapolis.
- The shortest major league baseball game ever, the season opener between the visiting Philadelphia Phillies at the New York Giants' stadium, the Polo Grounds, was completed in 50 minutes with the Phillies winning 2–0. On September 28, 1919, the same two teams would play a game that lasted 51 minutes. The very next day, the Phillies and Giants played an 18 inning game, and the Polo Grounds burned to the ground that night.
- Winsor McCay's animated short film, based on the Little Nemo comic strip, premiered at Williams' Colonial Theater in New York.
- Pilot Pierre Prier made the first non-stop airplane flight from London to Paris, traveling 290 miles in 4 hours and 8 minutes.
- Tornadoes swept through 14 towns in Kansas, Missouri and Oklahoma and killed at least 25 people, destroying all but six of buildings in the town of Bigheart, Oklahoma.

== April 13, 1911 (Thursday) ==
- The U.S. House of Representatives passed the bill for a constitutional amendment requiring direct election of U.S. Senators, 296–16.
- Rebels in the Mexican Revolution defeated government troops in an attack on the border city of Agua Prieta, located in Sonora state on the Mexican-U.S. border across from Douglas, Arizona. Stray bullets flew across the border, striking buildings "as far north as Fifteenth Street", and killed two Americans, J.C. Edwards and Robert Harrington.
- British film producer Will Barker carried out his agreement for exhibiting the first motion picture of William Shakespeare's play, Henry VIII, after a six-week run in the United Kingdom. Barker had filmed one of the presentations of Sir Herbert Tree's production of the drama, and been allowed to show it to audiences. At Ealing, Barker carried out the burning of all prints of the film.

== April 14, 1911 (Friday) ==
- U.S. President Taft sent a warning to the Mexican government and to insurgent leaders to avoid fighting near the border and to not further endanger the lives of Americans.
- Born: Theodore Romzha, Ukrainian Greek Catholic Church bishop who refused to merge his church with the Russian Orthodox Church; in Nagybocskó, Austria-Hungary (now Velykyi Bychkiv, Ukraine) (murdered, 1944).
- Died:
  - Addie Joss, 31, American baseball pitcher for the Cleveland Indians and Hall of Famer noted for a 1.88 lifetime ERA, from tubercular meningitis.
  - Sir Henri Elzear Taschereau, 74, Chief Justice of Supreme Court of Canada from 1902 to 1906.
  - Denman Thompson, 78, American actor.
  - George Eggleston, 72, American novelist.

== April 15, 1911 (Saturday) ==
- As a followup to an agreement made on June 6, 1909, the $50,000,000 Hukuang loan to China by American, British, French and German Bankers was signed at Beijing. The Hukuang loan was held up by Russian and Japanese objections, and never made after the revolution in October.
- Born: Muhammad Metwally Al Shaarawy, Egyptian Muslim evangelist; in Mit Ghamr (d. 1998).
- Died: Lady HalléWilma Neruda, 72, Austrian violinist.

== April 16, 1911 (Sunday) ==
- Elections, supervised by the United States, were held for the National Assembly of Nicaragua. With the assistance of the Army, General Luis Mena, the Minister of War, secured the election of many of his followers to the new legislature.

== April 17, 1911 (Monday) ==
- Turning the key in the ignition to start a motor vehicle, rather than having to crank the engine from the outside, became feasible with the filing of the application for the first electric engine starter, by the Dayton Engineering Laboratories Company (DELCO). Charles F. Kettering of DELCO and Henry M. Leland of the Cadillac Motor Company collaborated with DELCO engineers in developing the system, which would be introduced on Cadillac automobiles in 1912. Kettering would be awarded U.S. Patent No. 1,171,055 on February 8, 1916, under the title "Engine starting, lighting, and ignition system", and DELCO would have exclusive rights to the car starter until 1933.
- The record was set for the highest number of immigrants–11,745—being processed in a single day through the U.S. Bureau of Immigration station at Ellis Island.
- The first public performance of "Alexander's Ragtime Band" was given, with the Irving Berlin tune being sung by Emma Carus as part of the Big Easter Vaudeville Carnival at the American Music Hall in Chicago.
- The city of Palm Beach, Florida, was incorporated.
- The Spanish steamer San Fernando, on its way from Huelva to Liverpool, sank off of Cape Finisterre. Four people were rescued by the Portimão, but 21 others drowned.

== April 18, 1911 (Tuesday) ==
- In response to a demand by U.S. President Taft, and the implied threat of an American invasion, Mexico's President Diaz informed Ambassador Wilson that his troops would avoid clashes with rebels near the border shared by the two nations. The agreement followed the deaths of two Americans in Douglas, Arizona, from fighting in Agua Prieta. Two days later, Diaz's formal note claimed that Americans had aided the rebels and had allowed shots to be fired from the U.S. side of the border.
- Born:
  - Maurice Goldhaber, Austrian physicist; in Lemberg, Austria-Hungary (now Lviv, Ukraine (d. 2011).
  - Huntington Hartford, American heir and billionaire, in New York City (d. 2008).
- Died: B.V. Matevich-Matsevich, Russian aviator, in a plane crash.

== April 19, 1911 (Wednesday) ==
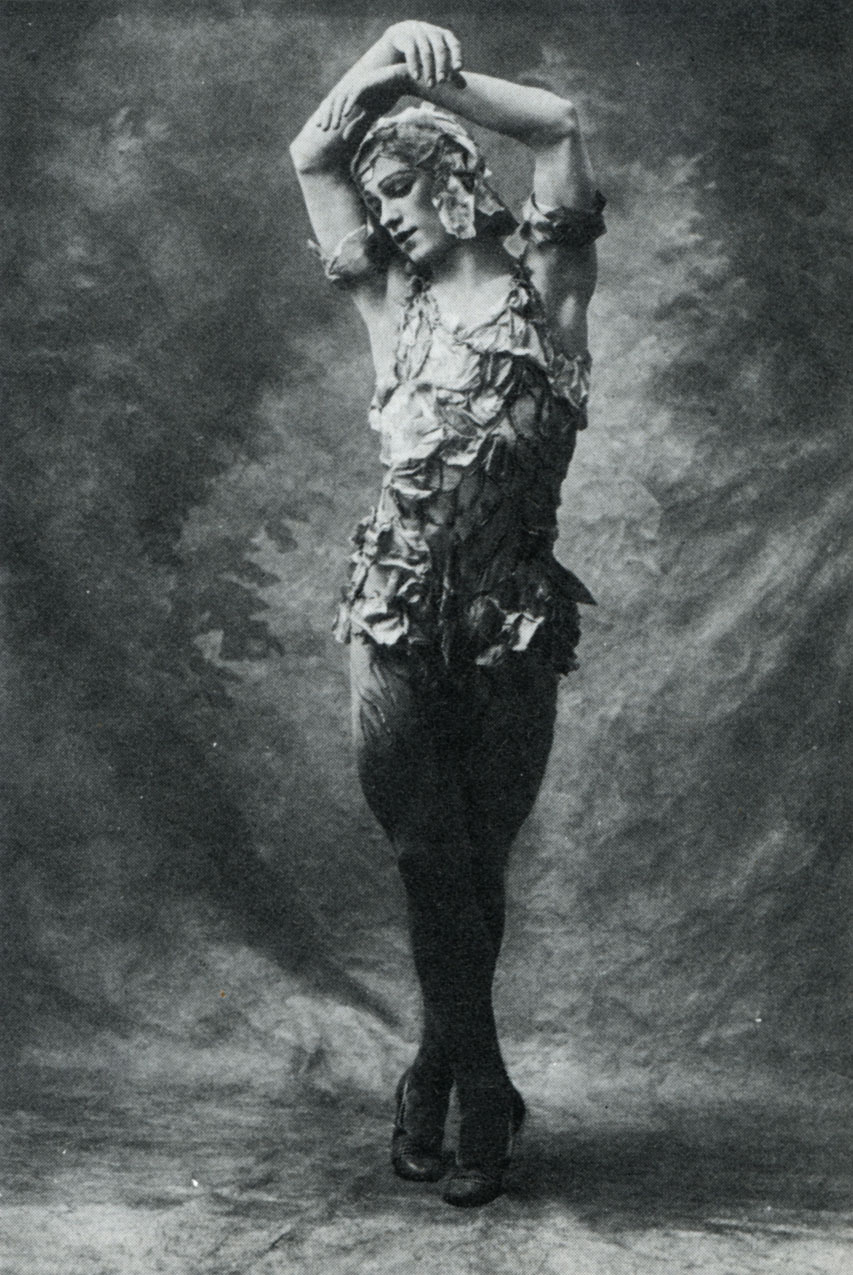
Nijinsky

- Ballet dancers Vaslav Nijinsky and Tamara Karsavina appeared in the first performance of Le Spectre de la Rose, choreographed by Michel Fokine. Nijinsky, playing the title role, stunned the audience at the Theatre de Monte Carlo with his exit, soaring into the air on wires and out through an open window.
- Performed for the first time on the very same day was Fanny's First Play, at the Adelphi Theatre at Westminster in London. The most successful of George Bernard Shaw's plays, it was introduced anonymously as it lampooned Shaw's critics.
- Born: Erich Hartmann, Germany's greatest flying ace who claimed 352 kills in World War II; in Weissach (d. 1993).

== April 20, 1911 (Thursday) ==
- Guarantees of religious freedom and separation of church and state became law in the Republic of Portugal. The new law also ended the centuries-old provision that the Roman Catholic Church was the state religion, and halted government payment of church expenses.
- Born: Kukrit Pramoj, Prime Minister of Thailand, 1975 to 1976; in Bangkok (d. 1995).

== April 21, 1911 (Friday) ==
- The U.S. House again passed the Canadian Reciprocity Bill 266–89.
- American troops near the Mexican border were ordered to strictly enforce neutrality laws.

== April 22, 1911 (Saturday) ==
- John J. McNamara, Secretary-Treasurer of the International Association of Structural Iron Workers, was arrested along with two other men and charged with murder for the Los Angeles Times bombing that killed 21 people. His brother James McNamara would escape a death sentence by pleading guilty and would spend the rest of his life in prison, dying 30 years after the October 1 bombing, on March 8, 1941. John McNamara would be released in 1921, two months before his death.
- The collapse of a railroad bridge at the Cape Colony caused a train to fall into a deep gorge, killing 20 people.
- Edwin Blatt, Lawrence Converse and Brown, who had been jailed two months earlier for aiding the rebellion, were released by order of President Diaz.
- Minnesota abolished the death penalty, as Governor Adolph O. Eberhart signed a bill making first degree murder punishable by life in prison.
- Born: The Tetrarch, Irish-bred British racehorse that was ancestor to "most modern thoroughbreds worldwide, making him a huge influence on the breed."; at Straffan, County Kildare (d. 1935). All 20 of the entries in the 2017 Kentucky Derby were descendants of The Tetrarch, who sired only 130 foals during his stud career.
- Died: John Passmore Edwards, 88, English philanthropist and peace activist.

== April 23, 1911 (Sunday) ==
- Elections were held for the first time in Monaco.
- French Army General Charles-Emile Moinier was ordered to begin an assault on the Moroccan city of Fez.
- Born: Ronald Neame, British film director; in London (d. 2010).

== April 24, 1911 (Monday) ==
- Former Dominican Republic President Carlos Felipe Morales, along with his vice-president and a general, were arrested by American officials in Puerto Rico and charged with conspiracy to overthrow the Dominican government.
- A copy of the Gutenberg Bible, part of the vast collection of the late Robert Hoe, was auctioned in New York City for $50,000 as George D. Smith, acting as agent for Henry E. Huntington, outbid Joseph E. Widener.

== April 25, 1911 (Tuesday) ==
- A ceasefire was declared in Mexico between federal and insurgent troops as President Diaz and General Madero agreed to negotiate a settlement. Peace reigned for 11 days before the talks broke off on May 6.
- Died:
  - Dr. Charles Wertheimer, 60, British art collector.
  - Emilio Salgari, 48, Italian novelist.

== April 26, 1911 (Wednesday) ==
- By a 60–40 majority, Australian voters rejected referendum proposals to give the Commonwealth government greater power.
- The town of Goldsboro, Florida, was abolished by the state legislature after the nearby city of Sanford had failed to secure its annexation. The two cities were then replaced by a newly chartered Sanford, Florida
- The town of Craig, Iowa was incorporated in Plymouth County
- Died:
  - Pedro A. Paterno, 53, Philippine revolutionary and Prime Minister (May to November 1899) of the first Philippine Republic.
  - Reverend Peter Steenstra, 78, American theologian.

== April 27, 1911 (Thursday) ==
- The Huanghuagang Uprising broke out in Canton (now Guangzhou), and rebels captured five Chinese villages in an attempt to challenge the Imperial government. The persons who died in the attempt would be celebrated later as "the 72 Martyrs."

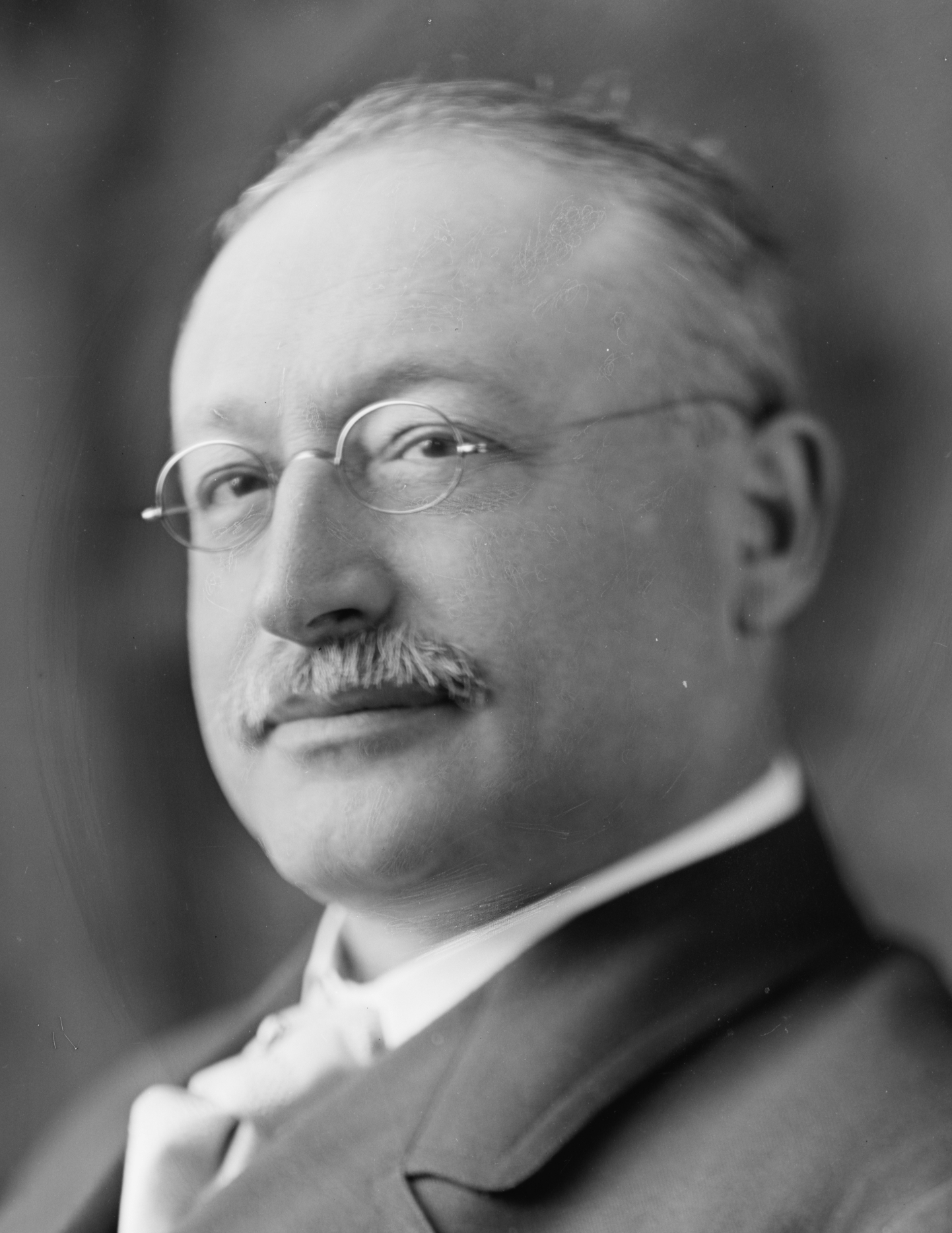
First Socialist U.S. Congressman, Victor L. Berger

- Freshman Congressman Victor L. Berger, Socialist from Wisconsin, introduced a resolution to amend Article I of the United States Constitution in order to abolish the United States Senate. "The idea that the Senate would concur in passing this joint resolution caused a merry laugh wherever it was discussed," noted the New York Times.
- France notified parties to the Algeciras convention that it would intervene in Morocco to protect foreigners in Fes.

== April 28, 1911 (Friday) ==
- The world of physics first learned of the principle of superconductivity as H. Kamerlingh Onnes presented his findings to the Royal Netherlands Academy of Arts and Sciences in the paper, "De weerstand van zuiver kwik bij heliumtemperaturen" ("The resistance of pure mercury at helium temperatures").

== April 29, 1911 (Saturday) ==
- Thirty-two residents with property along the shores of the Severn River in Maryland came together in Annapolis to form the Severn River Association (SRA). Their original purpose was to protect and promote fish and game, and to develop reasonable means of public access to the river. The SRA is the oldest organization in the United States dedicated to the preservation of a river, and one of the largest civic groups in Anne Arundel County, with over seventy communities represented.
- A train transporting 160 schoolteachers and their friends from Utica, Syracuse, and Waterville, New York, to Washington, D.C., derailed near Easton, Pennsylvania. Seven teachers, all from Utica, died when the train plunged down and embankment and cars burst into flames, and four railroad employees were killed.
- Born: Sri Mahendranath, tantric teacher, as Lawrence Amos Miles in London (d. 1991)
- Died: Georg, Prince of Schaumburg-Lippe, 64, who, since 1893, had ruled the German principality from his palace at Bückeburg in what is now the Niedersachsen state of Germany. His son took the title of Prince Adolf II and ruled until Germany lost World War I.

== April 30, 1911 (Sunday) ==
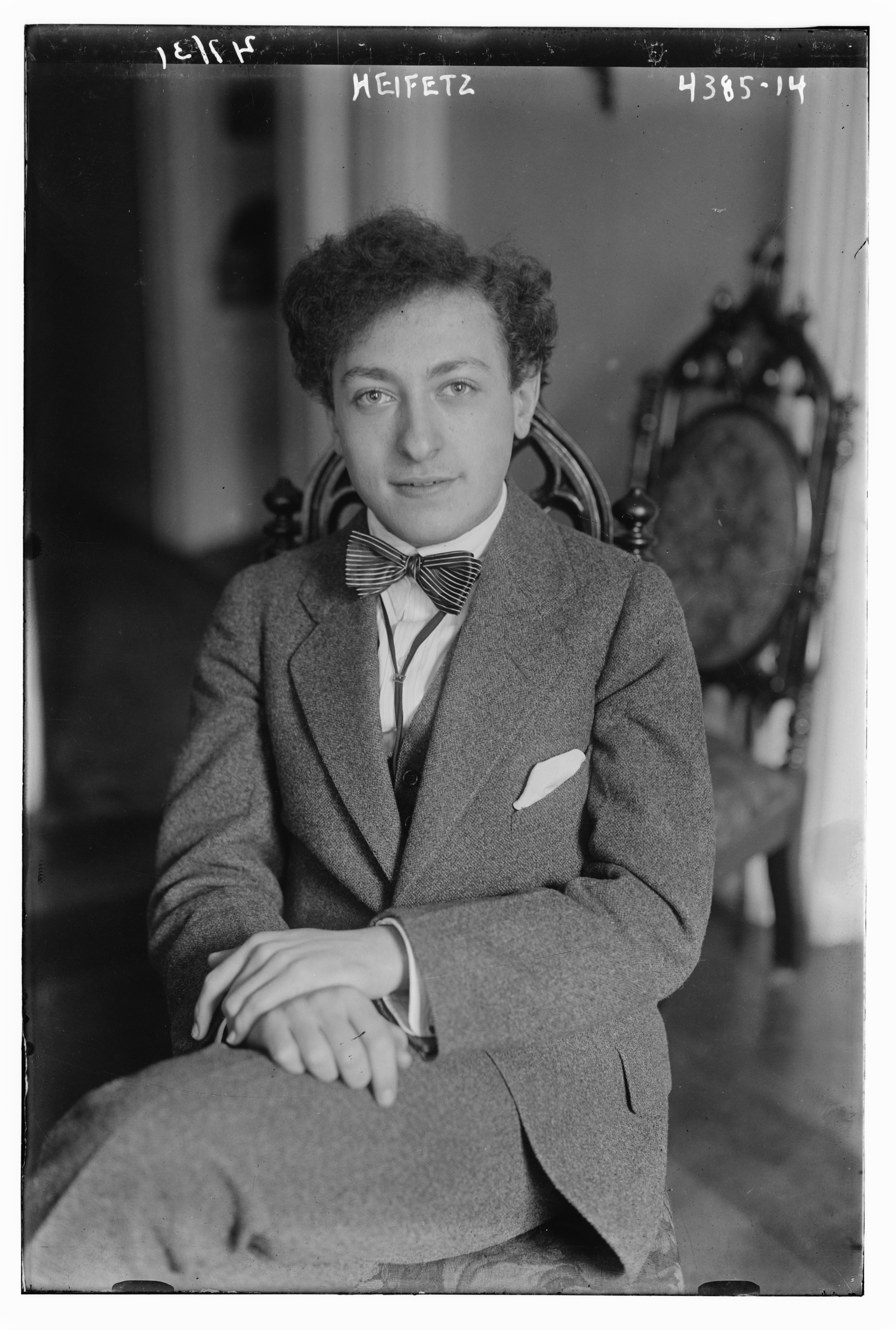
Heifetz at 17

- Jascha Heifetz, a ten-year-old violin prodigy, made his debut at a concert in Saint Petersburg.
- One-third of the city of Bangor, Maine, was destroyed by a fire. Thousands of people were left homeless.
- Died: Stanisław Brzozowski, 32, Polish philosopher, from tuberculosis.
