= Glenbank (ship) =

Several vessels have been named Glenbank, for Glenbank.

- Glenbank (1893 ship) was a steel-hulled sailing ship launched in 1893 at Port Glasgow. A cyclone wrecked her off Legendre Island 4 January 1911, killing all but one of her crew.
- MV Glenbank (1924), cargo ship that Harland and Wolff built for Bank Line, launched 23 April 1924, completed 27 June 1924. She was broken up in Hong Kong in 1959.
