= March 1911 =

Month of 1911

<<	March 1911					>>
Su	Mo	Tu	We	Th	Fr	Sa
			1	2	3	4
5	6	7	8	9	10	11
12	13	14	15	16	17	18
19	20	21	22	23	24	25
26	27	28	29	30	31

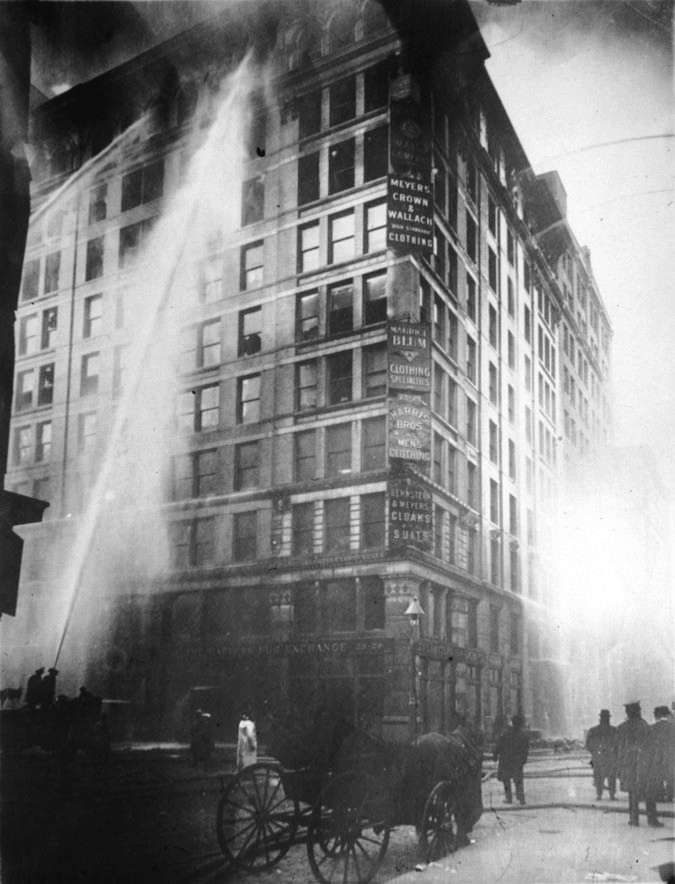
March 25, 1911: Fire at the Triangle Shirtwaist factory kills 123 female employees, 23 men

The following events occurred in March 1911:

== March 1, 1911 (Wednesday) ==
- U.S. Senator William Lorimer of Illinois was able to keep his seat after the vote to oust him failed, 40–46. Lorimer's right to a seat in the U.S. Senate had been challenged by Senator Albert J. Beveridge, on grounds that the Illinois Legislature had been bribed to elect Lorimer. "The resulting storm of public outrage", a U.S. Senate historian would later write, combined with newly elected senators, would lead the Senate to finally approve the amendment of the U.S. Constitution to provide for Senators to be elected by popular vote, rather than by the state legislatures.
- The U.S. House of Representatives unanimously approved the proposed Constitution of the State of New Mexico. Congress adjourned three days later without the bill being voted on by the Senate.
- The Weeks Act was signed into law by U.S. President Taft, authorizing the federal government to acquire "lands within the watersheds of navigable streams".
- Ernest Monis accepted the request of President Fallières to form a government as the new Prime Minister of France.
- José Batlle y Ordóñez was elected President of Uruguay.
- Pend Oreille County, Washington, was established.
- Died: Jacobus Henricus van 't Hoff, 59, Dutch chemist, Nobel Prize in Chemistry laureate.

== March 2, 1911 (Thursday) ==
- The vote on the second reading of the "Veto Bill", giving the British House of Commons power to override actions of the House of Lords, passed 368 to 243.
- Manuel Enrique Araujo was inaugurated as President of El Salvador.
- Alexander Scriabin's symphonic work Prometheus: The Poem of Fire was first performed.
- The Ottawa Senators clinched the title of the National Hockey Association, forerunner of the NHL, when the Montreal Canadiens lost to the Renfrew Creamery Kings. With 3 games remaining, Ottawa was 11–2 and Montreal 8-6; Ottawa beat the Canadiens 4–3 and 5–0 on March 8 and 10 to finish with a 13–3–0 record.

== March 3, 1911 (Friday) ==
- The first congressional appropriation was made for what would become the United States Air Force, with $125,000 being allocated for the U.S. Army Signal Corps to purchase airplanes. With the first $25,000 the Corps purchased three Wright Company and two Curtiss Aeroplane Company aircraft.
- The U.S. Department of Justice filed antitrust proceedings against General Electric and 34 other companies to dissolve the "Electrical Trust".
- The U.S. Army Dental Corps was created, with sixty dental surgeons in its employ.
- Adams County and Lewis County, Idaho, were established on the same day.
- Born: Jean Harlow, American actress, as Harlean Carpenter in Kansas City (d. 1937).

== March 4, 1911 (Saturday) ==
- With two years left on his term, U.S. Senator J.W. Bailey of Texas resigned, sending a telegram to Governor Oscar Colquitt at 11:00 am. After the Texas State Senate voted 20-5 for a resolution asking Bailey to reconsider, and Governor Colquitt asked likewise, Bailey sent a second telegram at 6:00 pm, withdrawing his resignation. Although there was no legal precedent for a member of the Senate to quit and then return, Bailey served nearly the rest of his term, resigning in January 1913.
- Francisco Bertrand became the interim President of Honduras as part of an agreement to end the civil war there. Bertrand replaced Miguel R. Dávila until supervised elections could be held in October.
- The 50th anniversary of the March 5, 1861, emancipation, by Tsar Alexander II, of 23,000,000 Russian serfs was celebrated nationwide. On the same day, a proposal by Prime Minister Pyotr Stolypin to grant citizens of Poland limited right of local government (zemstvo), was voted down by the State Council, 92–68.
- After the outgoing Congress ended without voting on the statehood for New Mexico and Arizona, reapportionment of the House, or the Canadian reciprocity agreement, President Taft called a special session of the 61st United States Congress to begin on April 4.

== March 5, 1911 (Sunday) ==
- A stampede in a movie theater at the Russian city of Bologoye killed 120 people, mostly children. The panic began after a movie projector caught fire.
- Carl Bosch redesigned equipment to make feasible the Fritz Haber process for commercial production of ammonia (invented July 2, 1909).

== March 6, 1911 (Monday) ==
- Samuel J. Battle, a former train porter, was sworn in as the first African-American police officer in the New York Police Department after passing the NYPD's civil service exam.
- "Knowledge by Acquaintance and Knowledge by Description", was read to the Aristotelian Society by Bertrand Russell.
- Born: Nikolai Baibakov, Soviet bureaucrat, Chairman of Gosplan 1965-85, in Sabunchu, Russian Empire (d. 2008).
- Died: William Worrall Mayo, M.D., 91, co-founder of the Mayo Clinic.

== March 7, 1911 (Tuesday) ==
- In an event whose significance was little noticed at the time, British physicist Ernest Rutherford first described his discovery of the nature of subatomic structure. The paper, The Scattering of the Alpha and Beta Rays and the Structure of the Atom, was presented before the Manchester Literary and Philosophical Society. Rutherford's experiments showed that all but 1/4000th of the mass of an atom lay within a core one-billionth of the space in the atom, and published in May in the Society's scientific journal, Philosophical Magazine.
- At 11:00 am, the United States Department of War issued a statement that "a large number of troops" was being moved to points in Texas and southern California, and that the Department of the Navy had ordered 15 ships from the Atlantic Fleet to the Texas coast, including four armoured cruisers. In addition, 2,000 U.S. Marines had been ordered to assemble at the Guantanamo Bay base. The operation, which had been taking place in secret since the day before, was limited to "manouevres." With almost one-fourth of the U.S. Army (20,000 troops) having been dispatched secretly by the President the day before, and the greatest move of soldiers since the American Civil War, the press was skeptical about the explanation. The New York Times observed "The United States is making a move as to Mexico that looks like a potential interference in the affairs of that country, though it wears the official aspect of a military mobilization." U.S. President Taft told reporters later in the day that he had reassured Mexican President Díaz that there were no plans to cross the border.

== March 8, 1911 (Wednesday) ==
- Ford Motor Company, Ltd., more popularly known as Ford of Britain, was incorporated as a subsidiary of the American Ford Motor Company, Inc. In October, the factory at Trafford Park, near Manchester, began building the first British-assembled Model T automobiles. Initially, the cars were made by four man teams, until the assembly line was set up in 1913.
- The honorary fraternity for educators, Kappa Delta Pi, was founded at the University of Illinois, and now has 606 chapters.
- The city of Waldport, Oregon, was incorporated.
- The first observation of International Women's Day did not take place on March 8, 1911, although the day was first observed in 1911, and it is now observed annually on 8 March. The first IWD was on March 19, 1911.
- Born:
  - Alan Hovhaness, American composer, as Alan Vaness Chakmakjian in Somerville, Massachusetts (d. 2000).
  - Clarence M. Mitchell, Jr., American civil rights lobbyist, in Baltimore (d. 1984).

== March 9, 1911 (Thursday) ==
- Pleasant Prairie, Wisconsin, the company town for the Laffin Rand Powder Company, was leveled by a powder explosion, killing 40 people.
- The greatest depth of snowfall ever recorded in the United States was measured at Tamarack Flat in California's Yosemite National Park. A snowfall in January totaling 390 inches contributed to snow at a depth of 454 in. (37 feet, 10 inches).
- The last American and British forces were withdrawn from Honduras, departing from San Pedro.

== March 10, 1911 (Friday) ==
- The Kansas legislature enacted House Bill Number 906, the first blue sky law in the United States, culminating an effort by Joseph Norman Dolley, Kansas' banking commissioner. The law, which became effective on March 15, subjected any person or entity, selling securities or other investments within Kansas, to state regulation.
- Culberson County, Texas, was established.
- The greatest snow-depth in U.S. and North American history was recorded, when 451 inches of snow was measured in Tamarack, California. (1,145.5 cm).

== March 11, 1911 (Saturday) ==
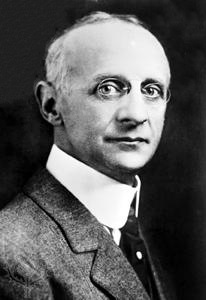
Flexner

- Dr. Simon Flexner announced, at a meeting of the Rockefeller Institute, the discovery of the cause of infantile paralysis, also known as poliomyelitis or polio. The "germ" (later determined to be a virus) was isolated from the blood of persons in Boston and New York who had fallen victim in the pandemic of 1908.
- Brooks County, Texas, was established after being separated from Starr County, and the county seat was established at Falfurrias. The county was named for Texas state legislator John Abijah Brooks, who had worked toward its creation and was the county's leader from 1911 to 1939. Willacy County, Texas, was established on the same day.
- Two weeks before the Triangle Shirtwaist factory fire, two men, Nathan Schefflin and Isadore Margolis saved the lives of 50 people who were trapped on the fifth floor of a building in New York City. The two were in an adjoining building eight feet away, and used a cutting table as a bridge to safety.

== March 12, 1911 (Sunday) ==
- Mexican federal troops defeated revolutionists at Agua Prieta
- Part of the crater of Mt. Vesuvius fell after a severe earthquake.
- Born: Gustavo Díaz Ordaz, 29th President of Mexico (1964–70), in San Andres, Puebla (d. 1979).

== March 13, 1911 (Monday) ==
- The U.S. Supreme Court upheld the federal tax on corporate income as constitutional.
- Born:
  - L. Ron Hubbard (Lafayette Ronald Hubbard), founder of Scientology and science fiction author in Tilden, Nebraska (d. 1986).
  - Marie Rudisill, American author who achieved fame in her 90s as the Fruitcake Lady in Monroeville, Alabama (d. 2006).

== March 14, 1911 (Tuesday) ==
- California Governor Hiram Johnson signed into law a bill providing for referendums, initiatives, and recall. The next day, he approved a bill for the Australian ballot.
- The Japanese Antarctic Expedition reached its limit as the Kainan Maru arrived at Coulman Island and could proceed no further.

== March 15, 1911 (Wednesday) ==
- The final trial to determine which firearms manufacturer, Savage Arms Company or Colt's Manufacturing Company, would receive the big contract to supply the U.S. Army with the standard .45 caliber pistol to be used by every soldier, came down to a 6,000 shot test at the Springfield Armory in Springfield, Massachusetts. The Colt Special Army Model 1910 had fewer malfunctions than the Savage Model H, and was accepted as the Army's standard sidearm.
- The city of Tropico, California, was incorporated and existed for almost eight years. In 1918, residents voted in favor of being annexed into Glendale, where it is now part of the Adams Hill neighborhood.
- The fishing ship Silver Spray was caught in a snowstorm on Lake Erie after departing from Cleveland. The tug foundered and all nine crew froze to death in the water.
- Born:
  - Ursula Vaughan Williams, British author, in Valletta, Malta (d. 2007).
  - Wilhelm Mohnke, German Nazi general, in Lübeck (d. 2001).

== March 16, 1911 (Thursday) ==
- With a population of more than 800 people, Las Vegas, was incorporated as a city in the Nevada desert. Fifty years later, its population was over 64,000. In 2011, over 550,000 people lived within city limits and the metro area was 1.9 million.
- Born:
  - Dr. Josef Mengele, German Nazi physician who oversaw human medical experimentation at the Auschwitz concentration camp, then eluded capture; in Günzburg (d. 1979).
  - Pierre Harmel, Belgian Prime Minister, 1965–66, in Uccle (d. 2009).
  - Sybille Bedford, German-born British novelist, in Charlottenburg (d. 2006).
- Died: John B. McDonald, 66, builder of New York City Subway.

== March 17, 1911 (Friday) ==
- A fire, caused by a plumber's blowtorch, destroyed Boundary Field, the baseball stadium used by the Washington Nationals, less than a month before Opening Day. Nevertheless, a new stadium was erected in time for the April 12 season opener.
- Anna Rogstad took office as the first woman to ever serve in the Storting, the Parliament of Norway.
- The State of Nevada enacted a law permitting the easiest divorce in the United States, available on proof of little more than irreconcilable differences and proof of at least six months residency in the state.
- Died: Friedrich Haase, 85, German actor and director nicknamed "Dean of the German Stage."

== March 18, 1911 (Saturday) ==
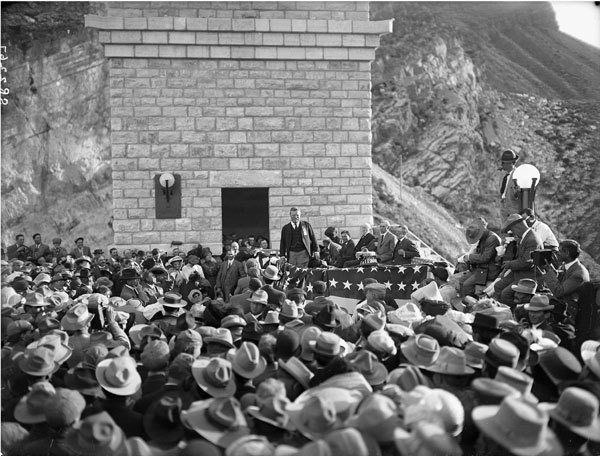
Dedication of Roosevelt Dam

- Alexander's Ragtime Band, which would prove to be Irving Berlin's first hit song, was published for the first time, in the form of sheet music. On May 23, the first recording of the song would be issued.
- At 5:48 pm, former president Theodore Roosevelt formally dedicated the Roosevelt Storage Dam in the Arizona Territory. At 248 feet, it was the second largest dam in the world (after the Aswan Dam in Egypt), and provided the necessary water supply and electric power for the city of Phoenix to grow, from roughly 11,000 in 1911 to more than 1.5 million a century later.
- Italy's Prime Minister Luigi Luzzatti resigned. He was replaced on March 29 by Giovanni Giolitti.
- Philadelphia won the National Billiard League Championship in a 50–47 victory over host Chicago, clinching the best of five series, 3 games to 0.
- The results of the 1910 German census were released, showing that as of December 1, 1910, Germany had a population of 64,903,423, an increase of 7.03% since 1905.
- Abraham Lincoln's funeral car was destroyed in a grassfire at Columbia Heights, Minnesota, six years after the late Thomas Lowry had bought it and worked on its restoration. The only item that was salvaged was a coupling link.

== March 19, 1911 (Sunday) ==
- International Women's Day was celebrated for the first time, with rallies and observances in Austria, Denmark, Germany and Switzerland. Since 1913, the day has been observed annually on March 8.
- Booker T. Washington, at the time the best-known African-American and acknowledged spokesman for the Black community, was beaten up by a white carpenter while on business in New York City. Washington had been in Manhattan to meet with D.C. Smith, the auditor for Tuskegee Institute and was mistakenly directed to an apartment building at 11 1/2 West 63rd Street. Albert Ulrich, a resident of the building, came into the hallway and chased Washington out of the building, then beat and kicked the 54-year-old educator. Ulrich would be tried for assault and acquitted on November 6.

== March 20, 1911 (Monday) ==
- Pyotr Stolypin resigned as Prime Minister of Russia. At the end of the week, he was persuaded by Tsar Nicholas II to return in view of deteriorating relations with China, and problems with his proposed successor, Vladimir Kokovtsov.
- The Winter Garden Theatre opened on Broadway in New York. Its first production was a double bill, Bow Sing followed by La Belle Paree, which was also Al Jolson's Broadway debut.
- Born: Alfonso García Robles, Mexican diplomat and politician, recipient of the 1982 Nobel Peace Prize, in Zamora (d. 1991).

== March 21, 1911 (Tuesday) ==
- The 300th anniversary of the introduction of the King James Version of the Bible was observed. After being presented with a specially bound copy by the Reverend Randall Davidson, Archbishop of Canterbury, King George V remarked, "During 300 years, multiplying millions of English-speaking races, spreading ever more widely over the surface of the globe, have turned in their need to the grand simplicity of the authorized version, and drawn upon its inexhaustible springs of wisdom for their courage and joys."
- Canada's Department of Immigration turned away 165 African-Americans from Oklahoma who were attempting to emigrate to Canada.
- Born: W. Lincoln Hawkins, African-American inventor, including antioxidant that made inexpensive telephone wire insulation possible, in Washington, D.C. (d. 1992).

== March 22, 1911 (Wednesday) ==
- The University of Porto was founded in Porto, Portugal.
- The SMS Kaiser, Germany's first turbine powered battleship, was launched from the shipyard in Kiel, on the birthday of the late Kaiser Wilhelm I (1797–1888).
- Born: Bienvenido Santos, Philippine poet, in Manila (d. 1996).

== March 23, 1911 (Thursday) ==
- The Australian ship SS Yongala departed from Australia with 122 persons on board and disappeared for 47 years. After leaving the Queensland port of Mackay at 1:30 p.m. on a 10 hour trip to Townsville, the ship never arrived. Wreckage was found days later near the Barrier Reef. The undersea wreckage would be rediscovered in 1958, and is now a popular attraction for scuba divers.

== March 24, 1911 (Friday) ==
- For the first time in history, more than 10 people flew in an airplane at the same time. Roger Sommer and 13 passengers went aloft from Mouzon, France and then landed there again.
- The New York's highest court unanimously ruled that the state workers' compensation law, one of the first in the nation, was an unconstitutional deprivation of property (the right for an employee to sue an employer in court) without due process. The objection was fixed by a new law giving workers the option to reject the act.
- The sinking of the American steamship Sechelt in the Strait of Juan de Fuca, off of the coast of Canada's Vancouver Island, killed all 24 persons on board. The 20 passengers were mostly employees of the Canadian Northern Railway. The ship had departed from Victoria, British Columbia with 33 passengers and her crew of four, but 13 passengers departed at a stop at William head.
- Born: Joseph Barbera, American cartoonist and co-founder of Hanna-Barbera, in Los Angeles (d. 2006).
- Died: Stanley Robison, 54, owner of baseball's St. Louis Cardinals, died two weeks before the start of the season. His sudden death paved the way for his niece, Helene Britton, to become the first woman to own a major league sports team.

== March 25, 1911 (Saturday) ==
- Five minutes before the work week was scheduled to end, the Triangle Shirtwaist Factory fire broke out on the 8th floor of the Asch Building at 23 Washington Place in New York City. The 8th, 9th and 10th floors of the building housed a company that made women's blouses, at that time referred to as shirtwaists. Although the building was fireproof, the cotton material used in the factory was flammable, and investigations concluded that the fire started when a cigarette ignited a rag bin. Around 500 employees, mostly women and girls, worked at the factory, and many escaped through a rear exit. Another exit was locked from the outside, and those persons who were trapped, trampled, burned, or jumped to their deaths over the next thirty minutes. A total of 123 female employees died, along with 23 men. The tragedy horrified the nation, and led to fire code and labor law reforms.
- Jim Wells County, Texas, was established.
- Born: Jack Ruby, American nightclub owner, and killer of Lee Harvey Oswald, in Chicago (d. 1967).

== March 26, 1911 (Sunday) ==
- The first 19 United States Postal Savings System banks were established, and 25 more the following day, with the intent of opening one in each of the 46 states in the United States. Locations were determined, not by geography, but by merit to the most efficient post office of each state. Thus, the central depository for the state of New York was in Cohoes, while the post offices in Pekin, Illinois, and Oroville, California, received deposits in those states.
- Born:
  - Tennessee Williams, American playwright (A Streetcar Named Desire, The Glass Menagerie, etc.) as Thomas Lanier Williams, in Columbus, Mississippi (d. 1983).
  - J.L. Austin, British author and philosopher, in Lancaster (d. 1960).
  - Bernard Katz, German-born biophysicist, recipient of the Nobel Prize in Physiology or Medicine, in Leipzig (d. 2003).
- Died: Henry Sylvester Williams, 42, founder of the African Association and Pan-Africanism activist.

== March 27, 1911 (Monday) ==
- The City of Fort Lauderdale, Florida, was founded when voters in the small village of 143 inhabitants voted to incorporate. The state legislature approved the town charter on June 2. The city, which in 2011 had nearly 180,000 residents, observed March 27, 2011, as its centennial date.
- William Henry Lewis was sworn in as United States Assistant Attorney General, making him the highest ranking African-American federal official. Lewis had been appointed by President Taft in October, but the U.S. Senate had adjourned before voting on whether to confirm him, allowing Lewis to assume the post pending confirmation.

== March 28, 1911 (Tuesday) ==
- The four men of the "Lost Patrol" were laid to rest by the Royal North-West Mounted Police (forerunner of the R.C.M.P.) at Fort McPherson in the Canada's North-West Territories. The four—Inspector Francis J. Fitzgerald, Constables Richard O. Taylor and George F. Kinney, and their guide, Special Constable Sam Carter had departed on the Police's traditional mid-winter 620 mile endurance trip from Fort McPherson to Dawson City. The group lost its way and ran out of its 30-day rations in January, and died while trying to get back to the Fort. The annual patrol was discontinued after 1921.

== March 29, 1911 (Wednesday) ==
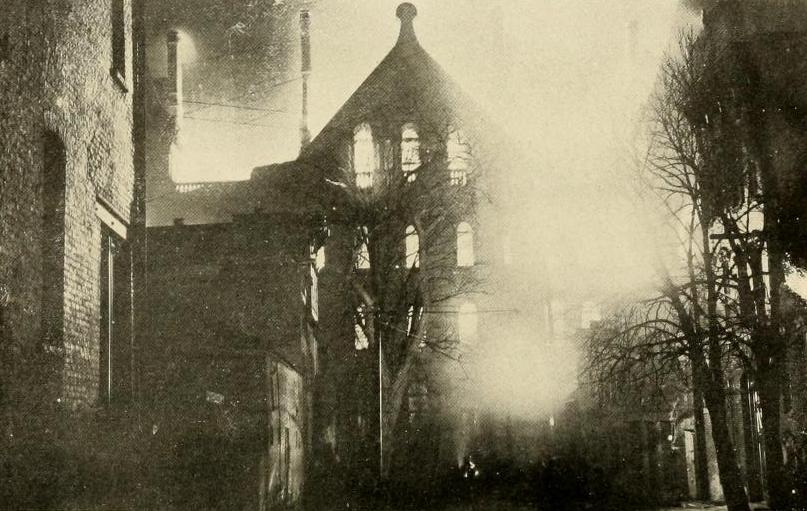
March 29, 1911: The New York State Capitol fire

- The United States Army formally adopted the .45 caliber M1911 pistol as its standard sidearm. The U.S. Navy and U.S. Marines followed suit in 1913. Originally manufactured by Colt, the gun was used by generations of soldiers worldwide, retaining the M1911 name from the year of its first widespread use.
- A fire broke out at the library of the New York State Capitol in Albany at 2:00 am, hours after legislators had adjourned for the night. The blaze destroyed more than 600,000 books, and manuscripts, many of them irreplaceable. Night watchman Samuel Abbott was the sole casualty.

== March 30, 1911 (Thursday) ==
- The University of Hong Kong was incorporated.
- Died: Ellen Swallow Richards, 68, American chemist and environmental engineer. She was the first female student at MIT and its first woman instructor.

== March 31, 1911 (Friday) ==
- Jerusalem's Mayor, Raghib al-Nashashibi and 150 prominent Arabs in Palestine sent a cable to the Turkish parliament, urging the Ottoman nation to stop further sales of land in Palestine to Jewish immigrants.
- Born:
  - Elisabeth Grümmer, German Alsatian soprano, in Diedenhofen, Elsass–Lothringen, Germany (now Thionville, France) (d. 1986).
  - Dong Kingman, American artist, in Oakland, California (d. 2000).
  - Freddie Green, jazz guitarist, in Charleston, South Carolina (d. 1987).
