= January 1911 =

Month of 1911

<<	January 1911					>>
Su	Mo	Tu	We	Th	Fr	Sa
1	2	3	4	5	6	7
8	9	10	11	12	13	14
15	16	17	18	19	20	21
22	23	24	25	26	27	28
29	30	31

The following events occurred in January 1911:

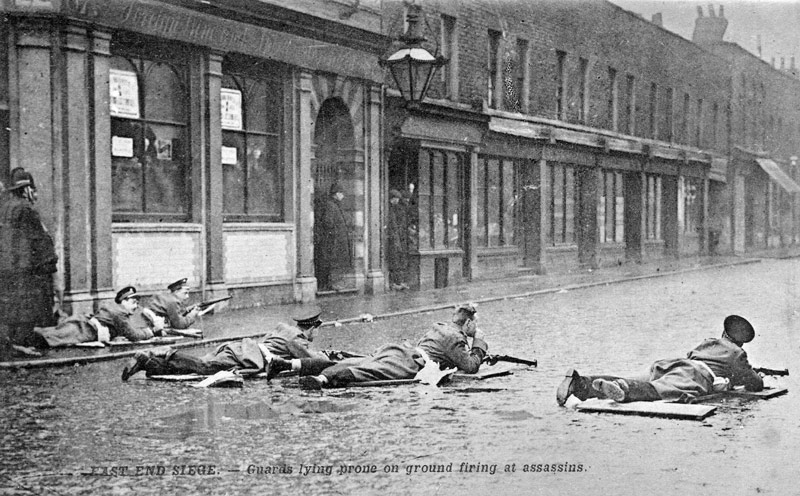
January 3, 1911: Police fight gun battle on London's Sidney Street

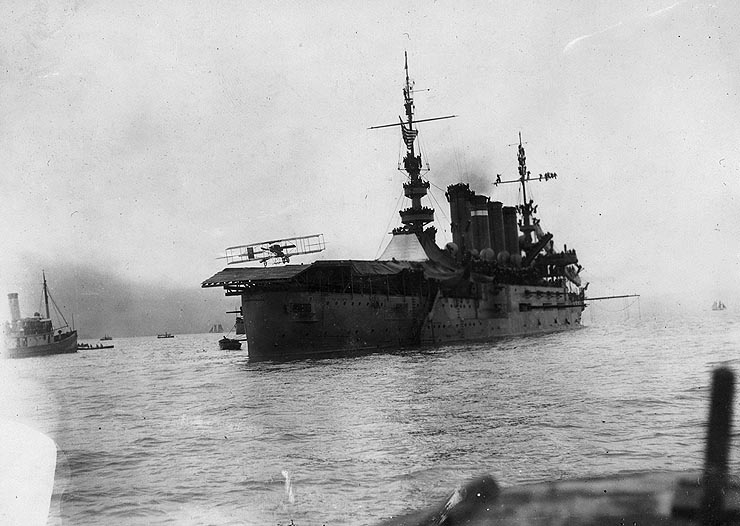
January 18, 1911: Eugene Ely lands airplane on ship

== January 1, 1911 (Sunday) ==
- The Australian Capital Territory officially came into existence, and the Northern Territory was politically separated from South Australia and transferred to Commonwealth control.
- General Juan Jose Estrada was inaugurated s the new President of Nicaragua
- The Evangeline Parish, Louisiana, was created, after being separated from the Parish of St. Landry.
- Under 38 U.S.C. 2301, a medal for Mexican Border Service could be awarded for any U.S. soldier who served between January 1, 1911, and April 5, 1917.
- Stamps were first issued for the Gilbert and Ellice Islands, now the nations of Kiribati and Tuvalu.
- The magazine Barton's Boys' Life, which would later become Boys' Life and the official Boy Scouts of America magazine, was first published.
- Toccoa Falls College was created in Toccoa, Georgia, after being relocated from North Carolina, where it had been the Golden Valley Institute.
- Born:
  - Roman Totenberg, Polish-born American violinist; in Łódź (d. 2012)
  - Hank Greenberg, American baseball player and inductee into the National Baseball Hall of Fame; in Manhattan (d. 1986)

== January 2, 1911 (Monday) ==
- The National Council of the Boy Scouts of America was established at 200 Fifth Avenue in New York, with seven employees.
- Manuel Bonilla declared his intention to return to his former post as President of Honduras after he and his forces landed on that nation's Atlantic coast, near Puerto Cortez. From the capital at Tegucigalpa, President Miguel R. Dávila cabled instructions to seek American aid in resisting the attack.
- The Islamic calendar year 1329 AH began with the 1st of Muharram, marking the closest the Islamic and Christian years came in the 20th century to starting at on the same day.
- Born: Ray R. Myers, known as the "world famous armless musician," in Lancaster, Pennsylvania. (d. 1986)

== January 3, 1911 (Tuesday) ==
- An earthquake of 7.7 moment magnitude struck near Almaty in Russian Turkestan, killing at least 450 people.
- In the Siege of Sidney Street in London's East End, 1,500 members of the Metropolitan Police and the Scots Guards fought a gunbattle with a trio of anarchists who had killed three police officers earlier. When the building caught fire, two of the men burned to death.
- Nearly 13 years after its destruction in Havana Harbor, the battleship USS Maine was dredged to remove the remains of the sailors on board.
- The United States Postal Savings System, with 48 branches, one for each of the 46 states plus the territories of Arizona and New Mexico, formally began business.
- A truce was made between the two rival tongs of New York's Chinatown, with the Hip Sing and the On Leong gangs hosting each other for banquets, then participating in a ceremony as the 100 men in each group cut off their queues simultaneously. The truce would last for only one year, before the Hip Sing leader was murdered.
- Born:
  - John Sturges, American film director known for The Magnificent Seven; in Oak Park, Illinois (d. 1982)
  - Joseph L. Rauh, Jr., founder of Americans for Democratic Action; in Cincinnati, Ohio (d. 1992)

== January 4, 1911 (Wednesday) ==
- The British Antarctic Expedition, led by Robert Falcon Scott, accompanied by the crew of the Terra Nova reached Antarctica, landing at Cape Evans, and prepared for an expedition to the South Pole that would begin on November 1.
- Born: Izzy Leon, light-skinned Cuban baseball player who pitched for the Philadelphia Phillies in 1945, after first playing in the Negro leagues (1944–48); in Cruces (d. 2002)
- Died:
  - Stephen B. Elkins, 69, former U.S. Secretary of State and incumbent U.S. Senator from West Virginia
  - Charlotte E. Ray, 60, first female African-American lawyer

== January 5, 1911 (Thursday) ==
- The African-American fraternity Kappa Alpha Psi fraternity was founded, with the first chapter at Indiana University in Bloomington, Indiana. The organization now has 713 chapters and over 250,000 members worldwide.
- White burley tobacco growers from Kentucky, Virginia and North Carolina met at Lexington, Kentucky, and agreed not to plant a crop in 1911.
- The town of Zillah, Washington, was incorporated.
- Born: Jean-Pierre Aumont, French film actor and war hero; in Paris (d. 2001)

== January 6, 1911 (Friday) ==
- U.S. President Taft refused to grant a pardon to H.S. Harlan, a wealthy lumber and turpentine factory manager convicted of labor violations, and signaled that he would not keep white collar criminals from serving prison time. "Fines are not effective against men of wealth," Taft wrote, adding that to relieve "men of large affairs and business standing" from incarceration "would be to break down the authority of the law with those of power and influence... What is worse, it would give real ground for the contention so often heard that it is only the poor criminals who are really punished."
- Died:
  - Sir John Aird, 77, architect of the Aswan Dam
  - George Walker, 38, African-American comedian with the Williams and Walker vaudeville duo, died of syphilis.

== January 7, 1911 (Saturday) ==
- The world's first downhill skiing race was held, taking place at Crans-Montana in the Alps of Switzerland. Lord Roberts of Kandahar, British war hero, sponsored the trophy, the Roberts of Kandahar Challenge Cup. Twenty competitors climbed to a hut at the Plaine Morte glacier and then made the 4,000-foot (1,200 m) descent. Cecil Hopkinson of Britain was the first winner.
- Monaco's Prince Albert I promulgated that nation's first constitution in response to protests against the absolute monarchy in the tiny European principality.

== January 8, 1911 (Sunday) ==
- The Australasian Antarctic Expedition, led by Douglas Mawson, commander of the Aurora, arrived at Cape Denison and encountered constantly blowing winds that dogged the group throughout its journey. Unlike Roald Amundsen and Robert F. Scott, Mawson sought to explore the Antarctic continent closest to Australia.
- Born:
  - Butterfly McQueen, (stage name for Thelma McQueen), African-American stage, film, radio and TV actress, known for Gone With the Wind; later the winner of a Daytime Emmy Award; in Tampa (d. 1995)
  - Gypsy Rose Lee (stage name for Rose Louise Hovick), American striptease entertainer; in Seattle (d. 1970)

== January 9, 1911 (Monday) ==
- A panel of the U.S. Court of Appeals reversed a federal court decision that had granted inventor George B. Selden an exclusive patent for the automobile. Henry Ford, who had been sued for damages in the form of royalties owed to Selden's Association of Licensed Automobile Manufacturers (ALAM) had lost to Selden in September. Ford posted a $350,000 bond to fight the appeal and the Court ruled that Selden's patent was limited. Victorious, Ford was cleared to create the nation's largest automobile company.

== January 10, 1911 (Tuesday) ==
- The fastest recorded temperature drop in meteorological history took place in Rapid City, South Dakota. Unseasonably warm weather saw a temperature of 55 °F (13 °C) at 7:00 am. Over the next fifteen minutes, the thermometer reading dropped to below freezing 8 °F (−13 °C). The weather warmed and chilled again two days later for another record.
- Manuel Enrique Araujo was elected President of El Salvador.
- The United States signed a treaty with Honduras, guaranteeing a loan to the Central American nation without assuming a protectorate over it.
- The town of Gladstone, Oregon, was incorporated.

== January 11, 1911 (Wednesday) ==
- Dr. Russell A. Hibbs performed the first spinal fusion, at the New York Orthopedic Hospital. Using techniques learned from knee surgery, and applying them to the vertebrae of the spine, Dr. Hibbs operated upon a patient with spinal tuberculosis to prevent further progression in the curvature of the spine.
- Created to promote research in the natural sciences in Germany, the Kaiser Wilhelm Society (Kaiser-Wilhelm Gesellschaft) was founded in Berlin.
- Emilio Estrada was elected as President of Ecuador.
- Southern Arkansas University began its first classes, with 75 students and 5 instructors beginning their term at what was then called the "Third District Agricultural School". In 1925, it was renamed Magnolia A & M College, and in 1951, Southern State College. The current name was adopted in 1976.
- The town of Mamou, Louisiana was incorporated.
- Born: Zenko Suzuki, Prime Minister of Japan from 1980 to 1982; in Yamada, Iwate Prefecture (d. 2004).

== January 12, 1911 (Thursday) ==
- An earthquake in Russia, at Vyerny, killed more than 250 people.
- For the second time in three days, Rapid City set a weather record. At 6:00 in the morning, the temperature in the South Dakota city was an unseasonable 49 degrees. Over the next two hours, the temperature dropped 62 degrees to 13 below zero.

== January 13, 1911 (Friday) ==
- De Nachtwacht, painted in 1642 by Rembrandt van Rijn, was vandalized for the first time at the Rijksmuseum Amsterdam. A recently unemployed cook slashed through the 269-year-old canvas with a knife. On September 14, 1975, a retired schoolteacher cut through the 333-year-old painting and tore off a section in the center, and on April 6, 1990, another vandal sprayed sulfuric acid on the now 348-year-old masterpiece, which has been restored each time.
- Born: Joh Bjelke-Petersen, New Zealand-born Australian politician who served as Premier of Queensland for 19 years from 1968 to 1987; in Dannevirke, New Zealand (d. 2005)

== January 14, 1911 (Saturday) ==
- The Norwegian Antarctic Expedition, led by Roald Amundsen, commander of the Fram, arrived at the Bay of Whales, where the base camp, Framheim, was established at the Ross Ice Shelf.

== January 15, 1911 (Sunday) ==
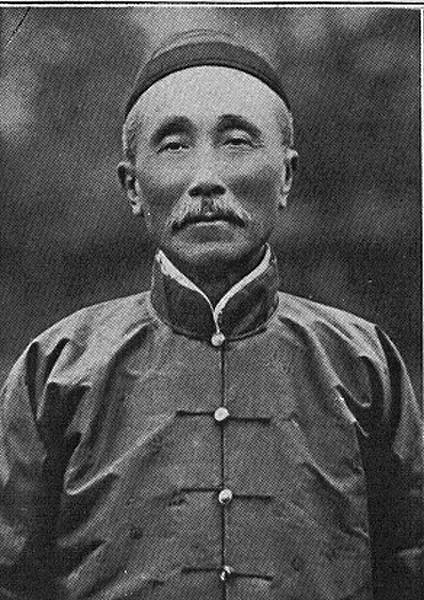
Wu Ting-Fang

- Future Chinese Premier Wu Tingfang addressed a crowd of 40,000 at the Zhang Gardens in Shanghai and announced that he had cut off the queue which he had worn in his hair as a sign of deference to the Qing dynasty, then urged the crowd to follow suit. At least 1,000 did so, and others followed suit as publicity spread.

== January 16, 1911 (Monday) ==
- The town of Millersburg, Iowa, was incorporated.
- The first military reconnaissance flight by airplane in India, and possibly in the world, was conducted by the British Indian Army from Aurangabad.

== January 17, 1911 (Tuesday) ==
- Two shots were fired at France's Prime Minister Aristide Briand in the French Champber of Deputies. Briand was unharmed, but Messr. Mirmam, Director of Public Relief, was injured.
- The German submarine U-3 sank in the North Atlantic, but 27 of its 30 men were saved. According to reports, the crew "donned the special diving helmets and suits and were shot to the surface by means of the submerged torpedo tubes".
- The U.S. Navy battleship USS Delaware (BB-28), assigned to carry the body of Anibal Cruz, the Chilean Minister to the United States, back to Chile, was sailing from Cuba to Hampton Roads when a boiler accident killed nine sailors.
- Haiti and Santo Domingo (now the Dominican Republic) signed a peace agreement, with both sides withdrawing troops from their common border.
- Recommendations by the National Monetary Commission for a "Reserve Association of America" with 15 districts were made public by a spokesman for U.S. Senator Nelson W. Aldrich. The plan was implemented, with changes, as the Federal Reserve System.
- Woodrow Wilson was inaugurated as the 34th Governor of New Jersey. Slightly more than two years later, Wilson, who had never held a political post before becoming governor, would become the 28th President of the United States.
- The play The Scarecrow, by Percy MacKaye, was first performed.
- Glenn Curtiss founded the first military flying school in the United States, at Rockwell Field on San Diego's North Island.
- Born: George Stigler, American economist, 1982 Nobel Prize in Economics laureate; in Renton, Washington (d. 1991)
- Died: Sir Francis Galton, 88, English explorer and biologist

== January 18, 1911 (Wednesday) ==
- Eugene Burton Ely became the first person to land an airplane on a ship, bringing his Curtiss biplane down on the deck of the USS Pennsylvania, anchored thirteen miles out to sea from an airfield in San Francisco. A 127-foot-long wooden platform had been built on the Pennsylvania, and 22 ropes strung across it. Ely's plane had three hooks on the undercarriage, to catch the ropes as the plane landed. Captain Charles F. Pond of the Pennsylvania praised the flight as "The most important landing of a bird since the dove flew back to the ark".

== January 19, 1911 (Thursday) ==
- Paraguay's President Manuel Gondra was forced to resign after less than two months in office. The Congress of Paraguay elected Minister of War Colonel Albino Jara to succeed him, though Jara would be sent into exile on July 6.
- In Philadelphia, Dr. Edward Martin performed the first cordotomy on a human being for the relief of intractable pain, with the assistance of neurologist Dr. William Spiller. The two published their results the following year.
- The legislatures of both Ohio and Kansas ratified the proposed 16th Amendment to the United States Constitution, providing for the collection of a federal income tax. After a discovery was made in 1953 questioning Ohio's statehood, the validity of the 16th Amendment was challenged, although 41 other states also ratified the amendment.
- Born:
  - Busher Jackson, Canadian NHL player and Hall of Fame enshrinee; in Toronto (d. 1966)
  - Ken Nelson, American record producer and Country Music Hall of Fame enshrinee; in Caledonia, Minnesota (d. 2008)

== January 20, 1911 (Friday) ==
- Dr. Walter Bradford Cannon first had the insight of a connection between stress, increased secretions of adrenaline and higher levels of glucose in the blood, writing in his scientific diary, "Got idea that adrenals in excitement serve to affect muscular power and mobilize sugar for muscular use—thus in a wild state readiness for fight or run. flight or fight!"
- A fire in a mine at Sosnowiec in Russian Poland killed 40 coal miners.
- Died: Solomon Dresser, 68, founder of S.R. Dresser Manufacturing Co., predecessor to Dresser Industries.

== January 21, 1911 (Saturday) ==
- The National Progressive Republican League was organized by a group of Republican Party members who were dissatisfied with the U.S. President William Howard Taft. Meeting at the Washington, D.C. home of Senator Robert M. La Follette, Sr. were 15 U.S. Senators and 13 U.S. Representatives. In 1912, former President Theodore Roosevelt was nominated by the Progressives to run against Taft and Woodrow Wilson in the presidential election.
- By a margin of 31,742 for and 13,399 against, voters in the territory of New Mexico approved the proposed State Constitution, clearing the way for Congress to consider it for statehood.

== January 22, 1911 (Sunday) ==
- Philip Orin Parmelee set a new airplane flight endurance record, keeping a Wright Flyer in the air for 3 hours and 40 minutes over San Francisco.
- Born:
  - Bruno Kreisky, Chancellor of Austria 1970–1983; in Vienna (d. 1990)
  - Mary Hayley Bell, English dramatist, wife of Sir John Mills; to British parents in Shanghai (d. 2005)

== January 23, 1911 (Monday) ==
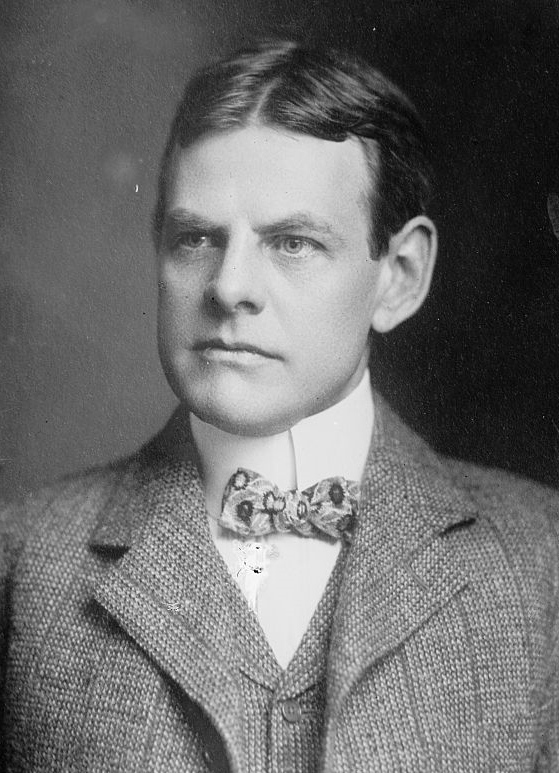
Phillips

- Bestselling author David Graham Phillips was murdered in New York by a man who had been offended by his latest novel, The Fashionable Adventures of Joshua Craig. Fitzhugh Goldsborough shot Phillips five times, then shot himself. The motive, police learned later, was that Goldsborough imagined that a character in the book was based on his sister. Phillips died the next day, after telling doctors, "I can fight two wounds, but not six."
- Chemist Marie Curie failed in her bid to become the first woman member of France's Académie des Sciences by two votes. From the 58 members, Curie received 28 votes, and Edouard Branly 29. On the next vote, Branly received the majority of 30, and Curie never again stood for membership.
- Born: Ralph Fults, longest surviving associate of the criminal gang of Bonnie and Clyde; in McKinney, Texas (d. 1993)

== January 24, 1911 (Tuesday) ==
- Kotoku Shusui and ten other persons were hanged, six days after being convicted of conspiracy to assassinate Hirohito, the Crown Prince of Japan.
- Born: C. L. Moore (Catherine Lucille Moore), one of the first women science fiction authors; in Indianapolis. (d. 1987)

== January 25, 1911 (Wednesday) ==
- An army of 1,600 mercenaries invaded Honduras and battled at La Ceiba against the Honduran Army. Successful, the forces of Manuel Bonilla then marched to the capital, Tegucigalpa, which would fall weeks later.
- U.S. troops were sent to the Rio Grande to keep Mexican insurgents from crossing into the United States.
- John P. White of Iowa was elected as the new President of the United Mine Workers of America.
- Born: Kurt Maetzig, German film director; in Berlin (d. 2012)

== January 26, 1911 (Thursday) ==
- Glenn H. Curtiss made the first sustained seaplane flight, taking off from San Diego Bay in his D-Hydro-Aeroplane and then landing on the Pacific Ocean off San Diego. (Henri Fabre had made the first takeoff from water on March 28, 1910).
- The United States and Canada announced the successful negotiation of the first reciprocal trade agreement between the two nations.
- Aviator Roger Sommer set a new record for number of passengers on an airplane, flying five passengers in France on a 13-mile (21 km) trip from Douzy to Remilly-Aillicourt, then back. The previous record had been set by Sommer on April 20, 1910, when he carried four persons on a short flight.

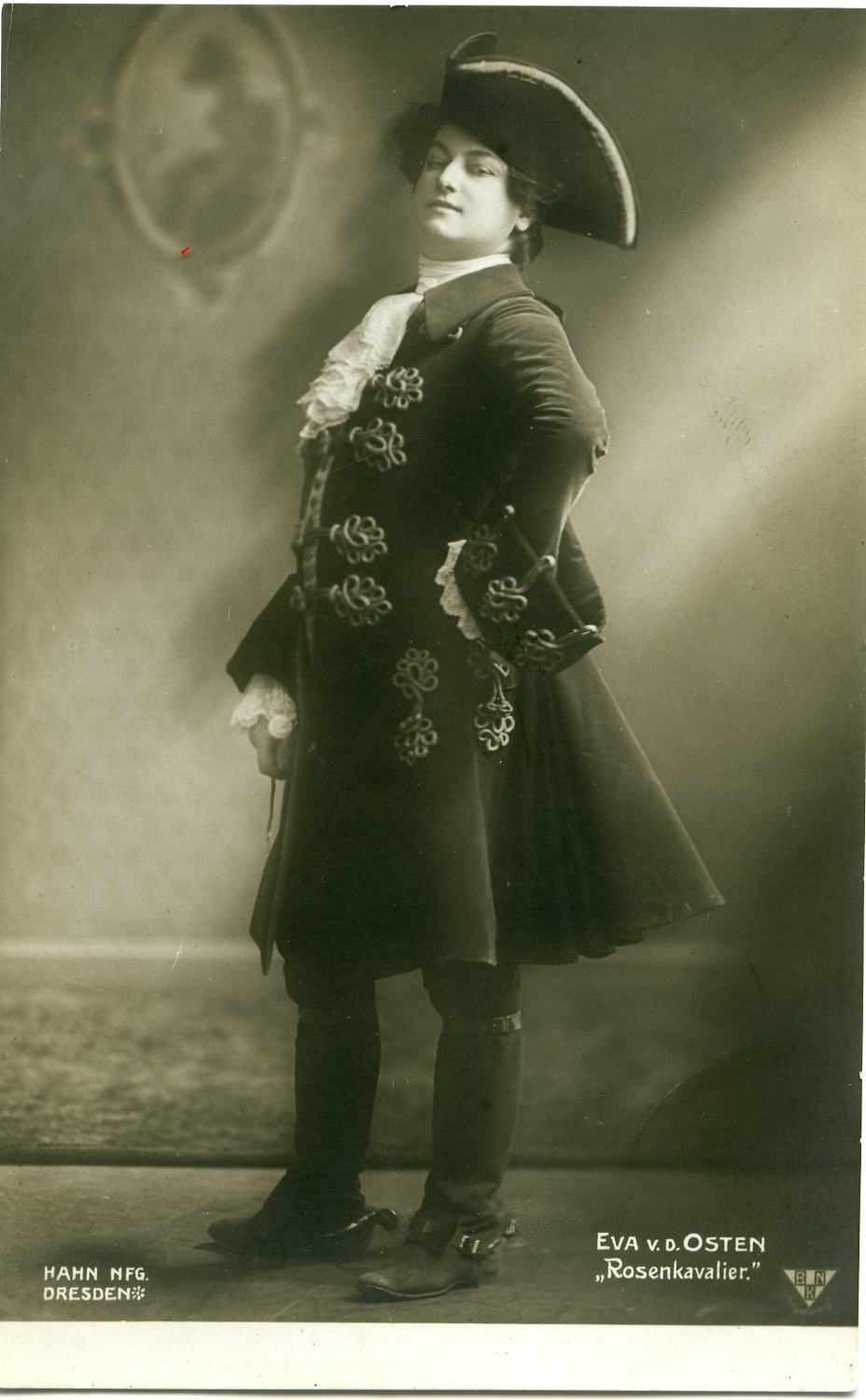
Soprano Eva von der Osten as Octavian in Der Rosenkavalier

- Richard Strauss's opera Der Rosenkavalier was given its first performance, at the Semper Opera House in Dresden.
- Born:
  - Polykarp Kusch, German-born physicist and Nobel Prize laureate, in Blankenburg, Saxony-Anhalt (d. 1993)
  - Johnnie Carr, American civil rights movement pioneer, in Montgomery, Alabama (d. 2008)

== January 27, 1911 (Friday) ==
- The University of North Carolina played its first college basketball game, defeating Virginia Christian College (now Lynchburg College) 42–21 at Chapel Hill.
- Several soldiers were killed in a border clash between Peru and Ecuador.

== January 28, 1911 (Saturday) ==
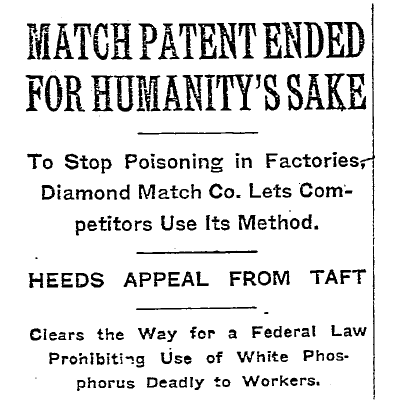

- The Diamond Match Company agreed to surrender its patent rights for a substitute for the poisonous white phosphorus, clearing the way for all matches to be safely manufactured.

== January 29, 1911 (Sunday) ==
- Eighteen Mexican insurgents captured Mexicali, in Baja California del Norte, without firing weapons.
- The comic strip "Mr. Twee Deedle", by Johnny Gruelle, debuted in the New York Herald and later in newspapers across the U.S. Gruelle, who had won the chance to show his talents in a national contest, later became more famous as the creator of Raggedy Ann and Andy.
- Following two days of protests in Guayaquil, President Alfaro of Ecuador abandoned a plan to lease the Galapagos Islands to the United States.
- Born: Peter von Siemens, German industrialist and Chairman of the Siemens AG conglomerate from 1971 to 1981; in Charlottenburg (d. 1986)
- Died: Elizabeth Stuart Phelps Ward, 67, American author

== January 30, 1911 (Monday) ==
- The destroyer USS Terry made the first rescue of an airplane downed at sea, saving the life of John McCurdy 10 miles (16 km) from Havana, Cuba.
- The eruption of the Mount Taal volcano on the Philippines island of Luzon caused a series of earthquakes and tsunamis, and killed 1,335 people. Mount Taal would erupt again on September 28, 1965 and kill almost 600 islanders.
- The International Pentecostal Holiness Church was founded by the merger of the Fire-Baptized Holiness Church and the Pentecostal Holiness Church, at a meeting in Falcon, North Carolina.
- James White, a disabled black youth, was executed in a public hanging in Middlesboro, Kentucky, after he had slept, at age 16, with a white girl and was then accused of rape. James Breathitt, the state Attorney General, concluded that White was incapable of understanding the charge against him, and asked Governor Augustus E. Willson to commute the sentence. Governor Willson agreed that White was "mentally imperfect", but added that "he is none the less dangerous to society, and if his case is not punished by death, is dangerous to the whole state". As an historian noted, "White, most likely unaware of the reason why, died on the gallows in Middlesboro before a crowd that numbered in the thousands."
- El Tiempo, the highest circulation newspaper in the South American nation of Colombia, published its first issue.
- The Carlton Cannes Hotel opened on the Promenade de la Croisette in Cannes, France.
- Born: Roy Eldridge, American jazz musician; in Pittsburgh (d. 1989)

== January 31, 1911 (Tuesday) ==
- By a vote of 188 to 159 in the U.S. House of Representatives, San Francisco was chosen over New Orleans to host the 1915 World's Fair, officially the Panama–Pacific International Exposition.
