= Grover C. Nash =

Grover Cleveland Nash (1911 – 1970) was the first black pilot to fly the mail for the US Postal Service, taking the role in May of 1938 to fly mail between Chicago and nearby towns. He was first issued a pilot's license in 1938 and was a member of the Challenger Air Pilot's Association in Chicago and a founding member of the National Airmen's Association of America.

Grover Nash was issued a private pilot's license in 1939 by Harry Hopkins, the US Secretary of Commerce.

Grover Nash of was one of many African-American aviators who lived and worked in the Chicago area where the Challenger Aero Club was founded.
