= Bernd Scholz =

German composer

Bernd Scholz (February 28, 1911 – September 22, 1969) was a German composer. His also assumed the pen name Klaus Textor for his popular compositions.

Scholz was born in Neustadt in Oberschlesien (now Prudnik). Even as a child he wished to become a composer, writing his first composition at age 12. After graduation, he went to Berlin where he studied German and music at the Akademie für Schul- und Kirchenmusik. His radio plays for the Berlin radio lead to film assignments including scores for the feature-length Nanga Parbat films of German expeditions in the Himalayas. He fought in the second world war and was held as a Soviet prisoner until 1950.

He returned to West Germany in 1950, married, had three children, and settled in Schliersee. He found employment in radio and television, working with the directors Lietzau, Beauvais, Düggelin, Schlechte, Westphal, and ten Haaf. He participated in the 1954 contemporary music festival in Donauschingen where his works were conducted by Hans Rosbaud (the same year when American composer John Cage's appearance became a legendary fiasco). He wrote his Japan Concerto for classical guitarist Siegfried Behrend and a large concerto for bandleader Willi Stech. He produced works for a festival of easy music, and his works were recorded and broadcast by all the major German broadcasters.

He is buried at the Schliersee cemetery.

== Works ==
- Konzerte
- Japanisches Konzert. Concerto for guitar and large orchestra. Premiered in Tokyo
- Piano Concerto
- Concertante for Winds. Premiered 1954 Donaueschingen Festival
- Intrade
- Japanische Regenmelodie
- Kleine Melodie von anno dazumal
- Kleine Serenade
- Land-Liebe
- Lebensraum
- Lederhosen-Polka
- Liebeswalzer
- Lied Ohne Worte
- Luftsprünge
- März-Gebet
- Mandolinetta
- Medaillon
- Mein Haar, Das Ist Mein Sturmhut
- Melodie
- Menuett
- Merry Day
- Mi ist ein schön's braun's Maidelein
- Minara
- Mir ist ein feins braunes Maidelein
- Monopoli
- Moritat von Anton Und Dorothee
- Nymphenburger Miniatur
- Olivia
- Ouvertüre zu Einem Possenspiel
- Ouvertüre zu Einer Harlekinade
- Papagallo
- Paradiso
- Rummelplatz
- Salzburger Spieluhr
- Schillerndes Spiel
- Schlesischer Kirmes-Dreher
- Serenade
- Serenata Melanconica
- Serenata Piccolina
- Siesta in Ibiza
- Sommerlaune
- Sommerwind
- Sonate Nr.2
- Sonatine
- Sonatine D-Dur
- Sonatine Für Flöte Und Klavier
- Sonatine Für Unterhaltungsorchester
- Suite Für Flöte Und Klavier
- Suite Galante
- Traum-Serenade
- Türkische Barcarole
- Verträumte Bucht
- Wenn du an die Liebe glaubst
- Westindia-Serenade
- Xylophonetik

=== Works under the pen name Klaus Textor ===
- Aus Grossmutters Salon-Album
- Angry-Swing
- Blue Dark-Blues
- Candlelight-Blues
- Der Jongleur-Fox
- Der Traum des Zirkusreiters
- Fiesta-Mambo
- Gay Play
- Glasmosaik
- Gluecksklee
- Happiness-Fox
- Hund und Katze
- Ich Finde die Liebe sentimental
- In der Bucht Von Riva
- In der Toscana
- Irrlichter
- Kleine Strassenmelodie
- Kleiner Konzertwalzer
- Lied im Schilf
- Lolita-Fox
- Mi ist ein rot Goldringelein
- Mimosen-Tango
- Mistral
- Morgens in der Fruehe
- Novella Amorosa
- Nudelbrett-Polka
- Party-Bummel
- Ping-Pong
- Pulli-Rock
- Roulette
- Rundherum-Polka
- Schmollwinkel-Polka
- Seifenblasen
- Spaziergang am See
- Staccato-Intermezzo
- Suedland-Express
- Sweety
- Tearoom-Story
- Tristy
- Trompeten-Ballade
- Valsette Parsienne
- Velocipede-Boogie
- Wolkenjagd

=== Music for cinema, documentaries, and television ===
- Nanga Parbat 1936, Film footage of the German Himalaya-Expedition 1934
- Kampf um den Himalaya 1938. Film footage of the German Nanga Parbat-Expedition 1937
- An den Wassern Kaschmirs, 1938. Documentary
- Fahrt ins Leben 1940. Film of prewar sea cadets and life at sea. Directed by Bernd Hofmann
- Henkel, ein deutsches Werk in seiner Arbeit. Directed by Walter Ruttmann, 1938
- Die wundersame Schustersfrau, Television play after García Lorca. Directed by Werner Schlechte
- Kolportage 1957. Comedy by Georg Kaiser. Television play directed by Hans Lietzau
- Viktoria. 1957 film after a novel by Knut Hamsun. Directed by Frank Lothar
- Die Kleinbürger. after Maxim Gorki 1996 Television remake by Werner Schlechte.
- Das Glück sucht seine Kinder. 1955. Television play after the novella „Der silberne Krug“ (Jug of Silver) by Truman Capote. Directed by Heinz Schimmelpfennig
- Schatzgräbergeschichten. 1969 by Werner Bergengruen
- Der Spazierstock. 1955 Television play by Michael Sayers. directed by Karl Peter Biltz
