= Glenbank (1893 ship) =

Finnish merchant vessel (1893–1911

History

RussiaGrand Duchy of Finland
- Name: Glenbank
- Namesake: Glenbank
- Builder: Anderson Rodger & Co., Port Glasgow
- Launched: 1 August 1893
- Fate: Wrecked 4 January 1911

General characteristics
- Tonnage: 1,481 GRT, & 1,359 NRT
- Sail plan: Barque
- Complement: 20

Glenbank was a steel-hulled sailing ship launched in 1893 at Port Glasgow. A cyclone wrecked her off Legendre Island 6 February 1911, killing 19 of her 20-member crew.

== Career ==
Glenbank was built for Sterling & Co., Port Glasgow.She was the first of three barques that Anderson Rodger built for Sterling's Glen Line.

In 1905, J.A. Zachariassen & Co., Nystad, Finland purchased Glenbank.

In November 1910 Glenbank, Frederick K. Moberg, master, arrived at Balla Balla, Western Australia. Whim Well Copper Mines, Ltd. had chartered her to carry copper ore from the area to the United Kingdom. She had set sail for the UK with a cargo of copper ore that had not been secured.

On 6 February 1911 a cyclone wrecked the Finnish-owned steel-hulled sailing ship off Legendre Island on the Pilbara Coast with the loss of all but one of her crew. During the storm the cargo had shifted, causing Glenbank to capsize.

== Discovery ==
In 2022 a group of friends from Dampier, Western Australia, Kevin Deacon, Johnny Debnam, Tom Radley, Luke Leech, and Justin Leech, discovered the wreck of Glenbank. The area was originally found by Deacon who marked it as a fishing spot. Subsequently, Radley and Debnam lowered an underwater camera on the site that picked up footage of the wreck site. The team conducted the first dive on the site; extensive research led them to believe it was Glenbank. They then contacted the Western Australian Museum and revisited the site, conducting a survey and dive of the site with the team from Shipwreck Hunters Australia as a part of a documentary for Disney that also consisted of members from the original Dampier finders, Debnam, Deacon and Luke Leech. This expedition confirmed the Dampier group's research that it the wreck was in fact Glenbank.
