= May 1910 =

Month of 1910

<<	May 1910					>>
Su	Mo	Tu	We	Th	Fr	Sa
1	2	3	4	5	6	7
8	9	10	11	12	13	14
15	16	17	18	19	20	21
22	23	24	25	26	27	28
29	30	31

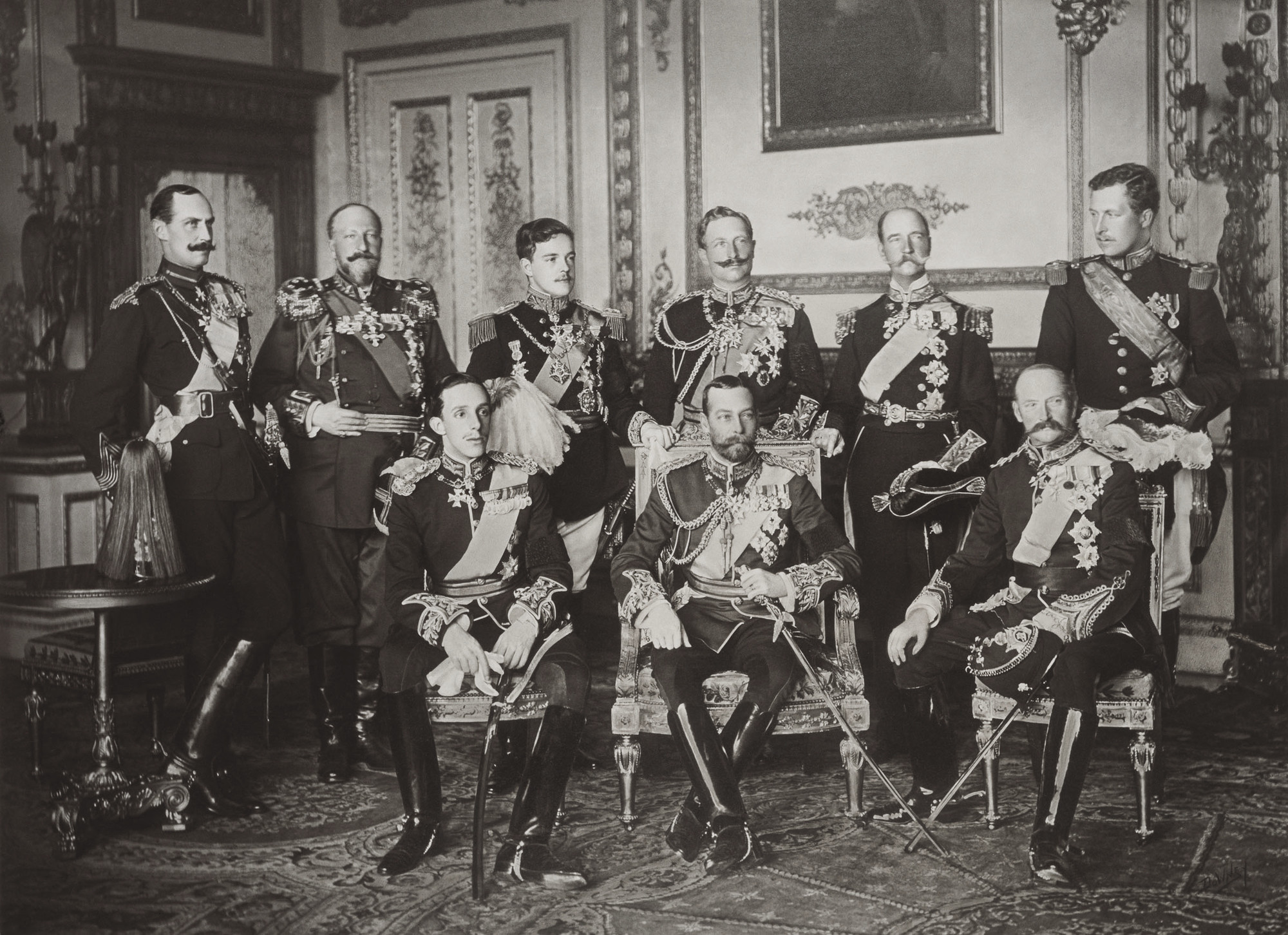
The Nine Sovereigns at Windsor for the funeral of King Edward VII, photographed on 20 May 1910. Standing, from left to right: King Haakon VII of Norway, Tsar Ferdinand of the Bulgarians, King Manuel II of Portugal and the Algarve, Kaiser Wilhelm II of Germany and Prussia, King George I of the Hellenes and King Albert I of the Belgians. Seated, from left to right: King Alfonso XIII of Spain, King George V of the United Kingdom and King Frederik VIII of Denmark.

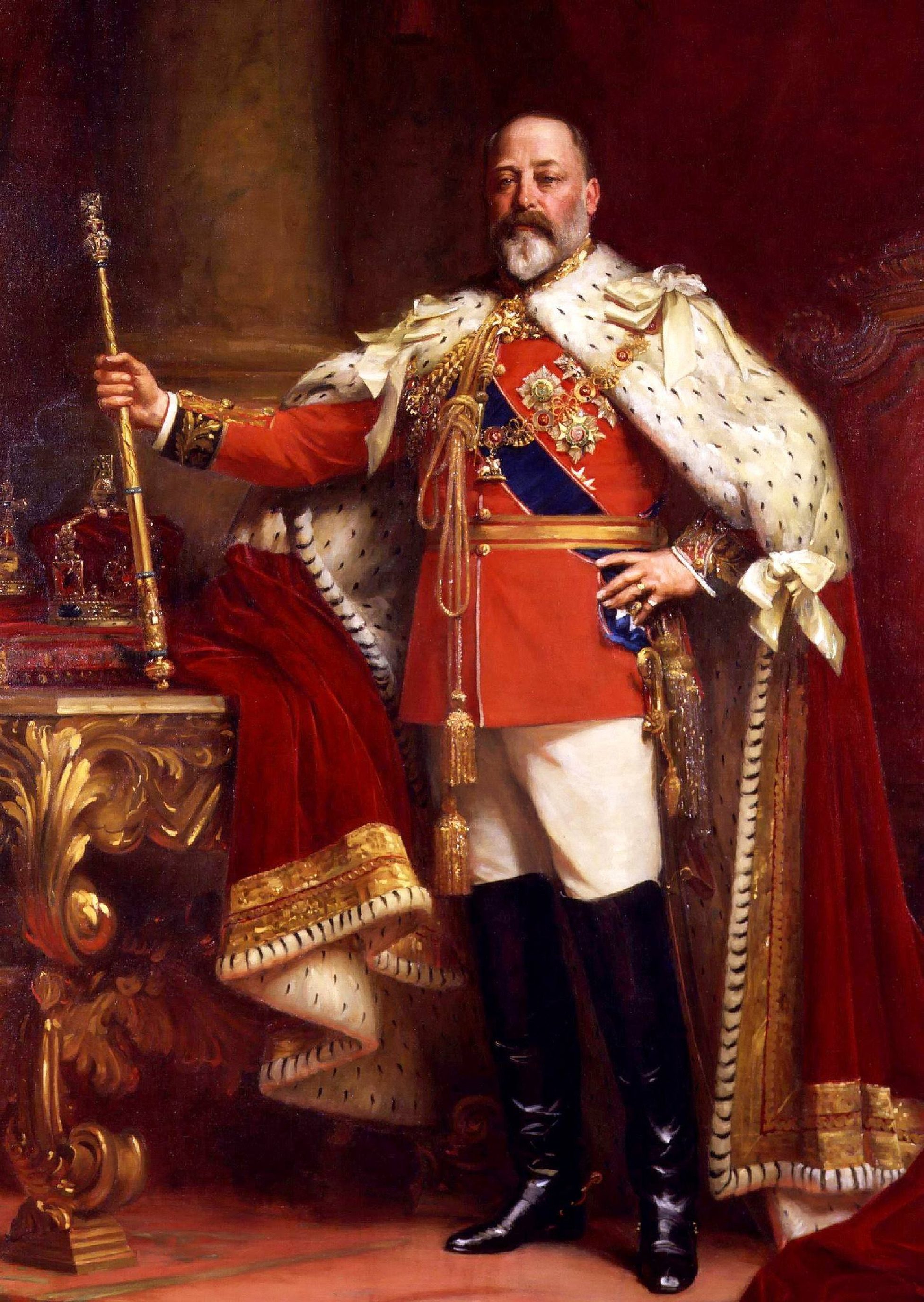
May 6, 1910: Edward VII, ruler of the British Empire, dies at the age of 68

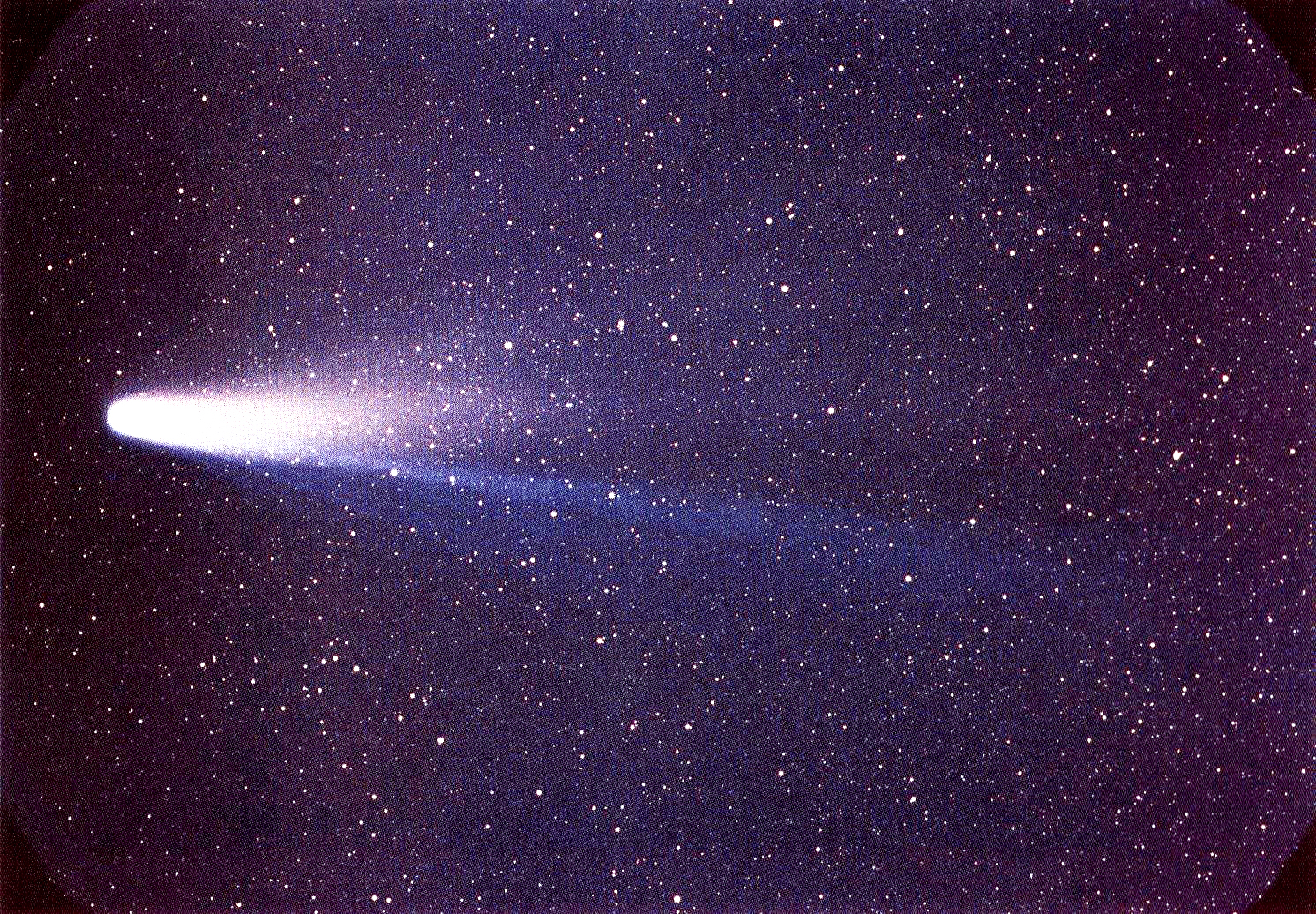
May 18, 1910: Earth's inhabitants brace themselves for their encounter with Halley's Comet

The following events occurred in May 1910:

== May 1, 1910 (Sunday) ==
- Edward VII, the 68-year-old King of Great Britain and Ireland and its possessions, and Emperor of India, developed a bad cold after spending a cold and rainy weekend at his estate in Sandringham. Refusing to rest and ignoring medical advice, the popular monarch developed bronchitis, then pneumonia, and was dead by Friday.
- Born:
  - J. Allen Hynek, American UFO author; in Chicago (died 1986)
  - Cliff Battles, American pro football player, in Akron, Ohio (died 1981)
- Died:
  - Pierre Nord Alexis, 90, former President of Haiti
  - J.Q.A. Ward, 80, American sculptor

== May 2, 1910 (Monday) ==
- The United States Senate confirmed Charles Evans Hughes as a Supreme Court Justice, without debate.
- The U.S. Senate also voted to approve creation of the United States Bureau of Mines, as part of the Department of the Interior, in the first federal regulation of mining. U.S. President William Howard Taft signed the legislation on May 16.
- Edward Payson Weston walked into New York City Hall at 3:10 pm, completing a walk across the continent that he had started in Santa Monica on February 1. The septuagenarian was greeted by New York Mayor William Jay Gaynor, who proclaimed, "Weston, you are a benefactor to the human race, for you have shown people what can be done by a man who lives simply and healthfully in the open air."
- Homesteading of the Flathead Indian Reservation in Montana was permitted by the federal government, with the drawing of the first names in a lottery.

== May 3, 1910 (Tuesday) ==
- The President of the United States returned to his hometown of Cincinnati, Ohio, for the first time since his inauguration. At his own request, William Howard Taft was treated as an "ordinary" citizen as he renewed acquaintances.
- The city of Robins, Iowa, was incorporated.
- Born:
  - Bernard Orchard, British biblical scholar; in Bromley, Kent (d. 2006)
  - Norman Corwin, American screenwriter; in Boston (d.2011)
- Died:
  - Howard Taylor Ricketts, 38, American biologist for whom bacteria of the genus Rickettsiae are named, died of typhus during research on that disease
  - Lottie Collins, 44, English singer and dancer known for introducing the song "Ta-ra-ra Boom-de-ay", died from heart disease.

== May 4, 1910 (Wednesday) ==
- The Royal Canadian Navy came into existence when the Naval Service Act became law, creating a force separate from Britain's Royal Navy. The first two ships, designated "HMCS" for "His Majesty's Canadian Ship", were the Rainbow and the Niobe.
- Twelve years after the USS Maine had exploded and sunk in Havana Harbor, the U.S. Senate passed legislation to pay for the raising of the ship's remains at "all convenient speed", and the bill was signed into law.

== May 5, 1910 (Thursday) ==
- The city of Cartago, Costa Rica, was destroyed by an earthquake that killed more than 1,500 people.
- Seventy coal miners were killed in an explosion at the Palos Coal and Coke Company at 1:30 p.m. at Walker County, Alabama.
- The town of Hillsborough, California, was incorporated.
- The U.S. Weather Bureau, predecessor to the National Weather Service, set a record, which still stands, for the highest altitude achieved by a kite. An altitude of 23,826 feet (7,262 m) was reached by the highest of ten kites on an 8 1/2 mile long steel wire.
- Dearfield, Colorado, was founded as an all-black community by Oliver Toussaint Jackson. The town made a steady decline after World War I, and the last resident died in 1973.
- Former U.S. President Theodore Roosevelt accepted the Nobel Peace Prize, for 1909, in Christiana (now Oslo), Norway, and pledged to donate the money "as a nucleus for a foundation to forward the cause of industrial peace".

== May 6, 1910 (Friday) ==
- King Edward VII of the United Kingdom died at 11:45 p.m. after an illness of six days.
- Oklahoma Governor Charles N. Haskell settled the dispute over which town should be the county seat of Adair County, choosing Stilwell over Westville.
- The village of Stratford, Wisconsin, was incorporated.

== May 7, 1910 (Saturday) ==
- USS Cyclops, a U.S. Navy coal hauling ship (collier), was launched. The ship would become famous in the world of the paranormal after its disappearance in 1918 while sailing, with 306 people on board, into the area known as the Bermuda Triangle.
- A total eclipse of the Sun was visible in New Zealand and in parts of Antarctica.
- The village of Acme, Alberta was incorporated.

== May 8, 1910 (Sunday) ==
- A fire at the General Explosives Company near Hull, Quebec set off a blast that killed fifteen people, and injured more than 100. Most were spectators who ignored warnings to leave the area. The blast shattered windows in neighboring Ottawa, Ontario.
- In elections in Spain, Premier José Canalejas retained his majority.
- For the first time in its history, the United States Supreme Court ordered the release of a convict from his sentence, on grounds that his punishment violated the constitutional prohibition against cruel and unusual punishment. Paul Weems, who had served at a lighthouse in the Philippines, had been held in heavy chains for malfeasance of office.

== May 9, 1910 (Monday) ==
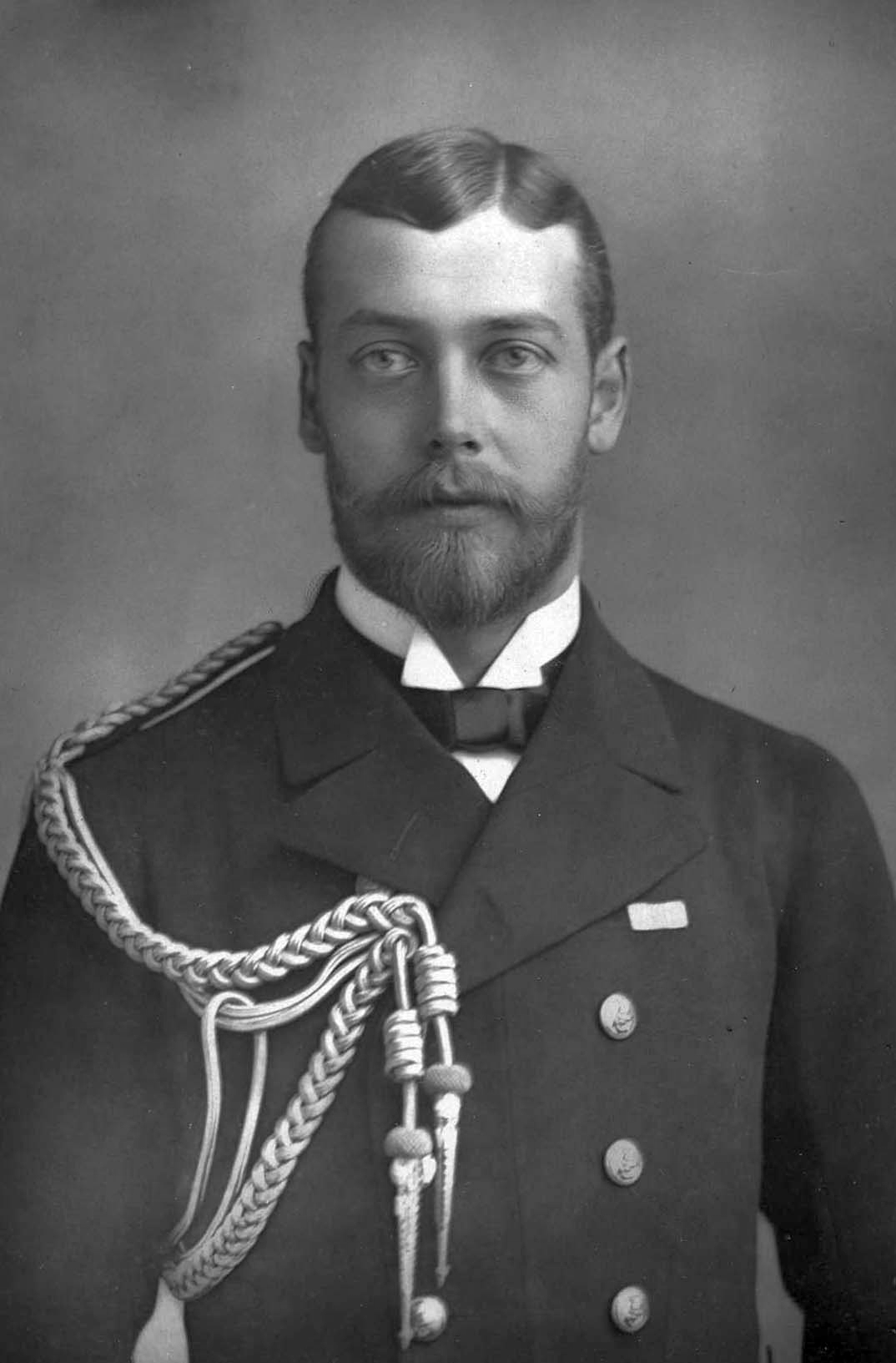
King George V

- Three days after his father's death, King George V was formally proclaimed worldwide throughout the British Empire, starting with the Duke of Norfolk's reading of the proclamation at St James's Palace that closed with, "God Save the King!"
- A total eclipse of the Sun was visible in the southernmost portions of the British Empire, including Tasmania and part of the Australian Antarctic territory.
- President Taft approved an act passed by the United States Congress to remove the wreck of the battleship USS Maine, which had been destroyed 12 years earlier in Havana Harbor.

== May 10, 1910 (Tuesday) ==
- Two hundred women from Peru, Chile, Uruguay, Paraguay and Argentina gathered in Buenos Aires for the first Congreso Femenino Internacional.
- The town of Powell, Wyoming, was incorporated.
- Beginning the history of aviation in Switzerland, Ernest Failloubaz piloted the first aircraft built and flown by a Swiss citizen.
- Died: Stanislao Cannizzaro, 83, Italian chemist known for discovering the Cannizzaro reaction, the of base-induced disproportionation of two molecules of a non-enolizable aldehyde to give a primary alcohol and a carboxylic acid

== May 11, 1910 (Wednesday) ==
- Glacier National Park (U.S.) was established in Montana by federal law. The park has an area of 1,584 square miles (4,100 km^{2}), and contains 653 lakes, 175 mountains, and 26 glaciers. After attracting 4,000 visitors in its first full year as a park (1911), the park had more than 2,000,000 visitors in 2009.
- In the U.S., 12 people were killed when the steamer SS City of Saltillo struck rocks and sank in the Mississippi River near Pevely, Missouri. The boat was carrying 57 people, and seven of the 27 passengers drowned.
- Born: Johnnie Davis, American actor and singer known for Hooray For Hollywood; in Brazil, Indiana (died 1983)

== May 12, 1910 (Thursday) ==
- An explosion at the Wellington Coal Mine in Cumbria killed 137 miners.
- USS Florida, the first of the all-steam turbine Florida-class battleships of the United States Navy, was launched.
- Born:
  - Johan Ferrier, President of Suriname from 1975 to 1980; in Paramaribo (d. 2010)
  - Dorothy Crowfoot Hodgkin, British chemist and 1964 Nobel Prize in Chemistry laureate; in Cairo, Egypt (died 1994)
  - Giulietta Simionato, Italian mezzo-soprano; in Forlì (d. 2010)

== May 13, 1910 (Friday) ==
- Woolworth's became the first large retail chain to sell ice cream cones, test-marketing the treat at counters at several sites that had been supplied with modern refrigerator-freezers. The idea was successful enough that it would be introduced nationwide by the variety store, and then by other chain stores.
- French aviator Gabriel Hauvette-Michelin became only the seventh person in history to be killed in an airplane accident, crashing while attempting a takeoff at a show in Lyons.

== May 14, 1910 (Saturday) ==
- At Brussels, representatives of Belgium, Great Britain and Germany signed a border agreement regarding their central African colonies, respectively the Belgian Congo (now Democratic Republic of Congo), the British protectorate in Uganda, and part of German East Africa now in Tanzania.

== May 15, 1910 (Sunday) ==
- The Italy national football team played its first international, defeating France, 6–2, at Milan. Italy would win FIFA World Cup championships in 1934, 1938, 1982 and 2006.
- The Reverend Henry Scott Holland, Canon of St. Paul's Cathedral, delivered a sermon following the death of King Edward VII, entitled "Life Unbroken", but often referred to by its first line, "Death is nothing at all." Largely forgotten for nearly 80 years, the words would find new popularity in the late 1980s as part of the consolation of grief.

== May 16, 1910 (Monday) ==
- While watching a parade of the Barnum and Bailey Circus, several thousand people in Newark, New Jersey, ran in panic caused by a false rumor. As the animals passed, a calliope had frightened a police horse, spectators scattered, and someone shouted that a lion or lions had broken loose. More than 20 people were injured, and five taken to the city hospital, but none fatally.
- In Missouri, Dr. Bennett Clark Hyde was convicted of murder, by poison, in the October 3, 1909, death of his patient, Kansas City philanthropist Thomas H. Swope. However, the conviction would be reversed and two retrials would end in hung juries. State law prohibited Hyde from being tried a fourth time, and he lived until 1934.
- Troops from the armies of Peru and Ecuador massed on the common border between those two nations.
- The case of Liliuokalani v. United States, 45 Ct.Cl 418 (1910) was decided by the United States Court of Claims, which ruled that the former Queen of Hawai'i was not entitled to compensation for the "Crown Lands" taken when the monarchy had been overthrown in 1893.
- The United States Bureau of Mines was formed, coming into existence on July 1.
- The city of Wedgeport, Nova Scotia was incorporated.

== May 17, 1910 (Tuesday) ==
- The chain reaction explosion of seven boilers at the American Sheet and Tin Plate Company in Canton, Ohio, killed thirteen employees and seriously injured thirty others.
- The U.S. Commission of Fine Arts was created by legislation signed into law by President Taft.

== May 18, 1910 (Wednesday) ==
- Non-Aristotelian logic was born, when Nicolai A. Vasiliev presented the lecture "On Partial Judgments, the Triangle of Opposition, the Law of Excluded Fourth" at the Russian Kazan University.
- Halley's Comet made its closest approach to Earth (15 million miles) and passed between the Earth and the Sun.
- An explosion of 3,000 pounds of dynamite at Pinar del Río, Cuba, destroyed the barracks of the Rural Guards force there, and killed more than 100 soldiers.
- Died: Pauline Viardot, French mezzo-soprano and composer (born 1821)

== May 19, 1910 (Thursday) ==
- The Earth completed its passage through the tail of Halley's Comet, without any recorded deaths from cyanogen gas.
- Judson Harmon, the Governor of Ohio, signed legislation creating teachers' colleges in Kent and in Bowling Green, today's Kent State University and Bowling Green State University.
- France and the Ottoman Empire signed a convention setting the boundary between their North African possessions, creating what is now the border between Tunisia and Libya.
- Born: Nathuram Vinayak Godse, Indian nationalist who assassinated the Mahatma Gandhi on January 30, 1948; in Baramati, Bombay Province (now in Maharashtra state), British India (executed by hanging, 1949)

== May 20, 1910 (Friday) ==
- The funeral for the late Edward VII of the United Kingdom took place in London, with the last great gathering of Europe's reigning monarchs, all on horseback. The new British King, George V, was followed in the procession by Wilhelm II of Germany, Haakon VII of Norway, George I of Greece, Alfonso XIII of Spain, Ferdinand I of Bulgaria, Frederik VIII of Denmark, Manuel II of Portugal, and Albert I of Belgium. Present also were the heirs to the thrones of Turkey, Austria-Hungary, Greece, Romania, Montenegro, Serbia, and the United Kingdom.
- The "High Treason Incident" began in Japan when, following an anonymous tip, police of the Nagano Prefecture searched the apartment of anarchist Miyashita Takichi, and uncovered bombmaking materials, along with enough evidence to get an arrest warrant for Takichi and his accomplices on charges of plotting to assassinate the Emperor Meiji.
- Vilhelm Bjerknes oversaw the simultaneous gathering of extensive meteorological data across Western Europe, using balloons in multiple locations. Lewis Fry Richardson used the data of May 20, 1910, seven years later in attempting to make the first mathematical calculations for weather forecasting.
- Chile accepted a loan of $13 million from the Rothschild family of London.
- Died: "Punch", 45, "the oldest horse in the world". Born May 14, 1865, Punch had outlived his original owner, polo player Woodbury Kane.

== May 21, 1910 (Saturday) ==
- The settlement of Ahuzzat Bayit, founded on April 11, 1909, by Jewish settlers in Palestine, was given the name Tel Aviv, Hebrew for "spring hill", or more specifically for the newness of springtime built upon a pile of ancient ruins. The name was also used in the book of Ezekiel at 3:15 ("Telabib" in the KJV).
- The United States and Canada signed a treaty in Washington to settle the dispute over the coastal boundary between Maine and New Brunswick.
- Ecuador and Peru accepted an offer for their boundary dispute to be mediated by Argentina, Brazil and the United States

== May 22, 1910 (Sunday) ==
- King George V of the United Kingdom issued pardons for many prisoners serving short sentences, and reduced the sentences of others, as part of a nationwide clemency.
- Born: Johnny Olson, American game show announcer known for The Price Is Right; in Windom, Minnesota (d. 1985)
- Died: Jules Renard, 46, French author, died from arteriosclerosis

== May 23, 1910 (Monday) ==
- On Lake Huron, 16 men and one woman, all aboard the steamer Frank H. Goodyear, were drowned after the ship was rammed by the steamer James B. Wood.
- Born:
  - Scatman Crothers (stage name for Benjamin Sherman Crothers), American actor and musician; in Terre Haute, Indiana (died 1986)
  - Artie Shaw (Arthur Arshawsky), American swing band leader and clarinetist; in New York City (died 2004)
  - Margaret Wise Brown, children's author known for Goodnight Moon; in Brooklyn (died 1952)

== May 24, 1910 (Tuesday) ==
- After a year's delay, a renegotiated loan offer was made to the Imperial Chinese government for construction of railroads in China. Originally financed by British, German and French banks, the terms were renegotiated to include American lenders as well. Dissatisfaction over the loan was considered a major factor in the 1911 Revolution.
- In Peking, an edict ordered the use of decimal coinage for China.
- Born: Jimmy Demaret, American professional golfer, three-time Masters winner (1940, 1947, 1950); in Houston (died 1983)

== May 25, 1910 (Wednesday) ==
- Wilbur Wright and Orville Wright flew on the same plane for the only time, with Orville piloting, at the Huffman Prairie airfield, near Dayton. Wilbur also made his last flight as a pilot on this day. Earlier in the day, their 81-year-old father, Bishop Milton Wright, went up on his only airplane flight, with Orville as pilot.

== May 26, 1910 (Thursday) ==
- The French submarine Pluviose was lost with all 27 crewmen in the English Channel after colliding with the steamer Pas de Calais. The lookout on the steamer had seen the sub's periscope, but mistook it for a buoy.

== May 27, 1910 (Friday) ==
- At the Palace Theatre in London, the first colour newsreel was shown. Produced by Charles Urban's Natural Color Kinematograph Company, the Kinemacolor film was titled Funeral of Edward VII.
- Died: U.S. Army 1st Lt. Edward Y. Miller, Governor of Palawan province in the Philippine Islands, drowned in the Aborlan River in the province. First Lt. Miller was known as the "King of the Palawans" and idolized by the 28,000 residents of Palawan.
- Died: Robert Koch, 66, German physician, recipient of the 1905 Nobel Prize in Physiology or Medicine for discovering the specific causative agents of anthrax, tuberculosis, cholera and other deadly bacteriological diseases

== May 28, 1910 (Saturday) ==
- Following an all-day battle for control of the coastal town of Bluefields, Nicaragua, rebels under the command of General Estrada forced the Nicaraguan army to retreat.
- The Mexican town of Arriaga, Chiapas, was incorporated.
- Born: Willard Hershberger, American MLB catcher who committed suicide during the 1940 season; in Lemon Cove, California (d.1940)
- Died: Kálmán Mikszáth, 63, Hungarian novelist

== May 29, 1910 (Sunday) ==
- Aviator Glenn Curtiss made the first airplane flight between two major U.S. cities, departing from Albany, New York and, after one stop for refueling, to New York City. He completed the 137 miles (220 km) flight in just under four hours and won a $10,000 prize offered by publisher Joseph Pulitzer, as well as permanent possession of the Scientific American Trophy.
- Died: Mily Balakirev, 73, Russian composer

== May 30, 1910 (Monday) ==
- General Louis Botha became the first Prime Minister of the Union of South Africa.
- The town of Bishop, Texas, created by insurance agent F.Z. Bishop, was founded.
- Rainbow Bridge National Monument was established in Utah.
- Born:
  - Harry Bernstein, English-born American author; in Stockport, Cheshire (d. 2011)
  - Ralph Metcalfe, American athlete and U.S. Congressman, known for holding the world record for the 100 meter dash (10.3 second) and serving as U.S. representative for Illinois from 1971 until his death; in Atlanta (d. of heart attack, 1978)
  - Inge Meysel, German stage, film and TV actress; in Rixdorf (died 2004)

== May 31, 1910 (Tuesday) ==
- The Union of South Africa was created from a merger of the British Cape Colony and Colony of Natal, and the conquered Afrikaans-speaking republics in the Transvaal and the Orange River Colony. At its founding, South Africa had 1,275,000 Whites and 4,000,000 Africans, as well as 500,000 Coloureds and 150,000 Indians, with voting rights limited to the White population.
- The town of Othello, Washington, was incorporated.
- Born: George Woolf, Canadian champion horse racing jockey (killed in accident, 1946)
- Died: Dr. Elizabeth Blackwell, 89, who earned her M.D. from Geneva College, and became the first female physician in the United States.
