= April 1910 =

Month of 1910

<<	April 1910					>>
Su	Mo	Tu	We	Th	Fr	Sa
					1	2
3	4	5	6	7	8	9
10	11	12	13	14	15	16
17	18	19	20	21	22	23
24	25	26	27	28	29	30

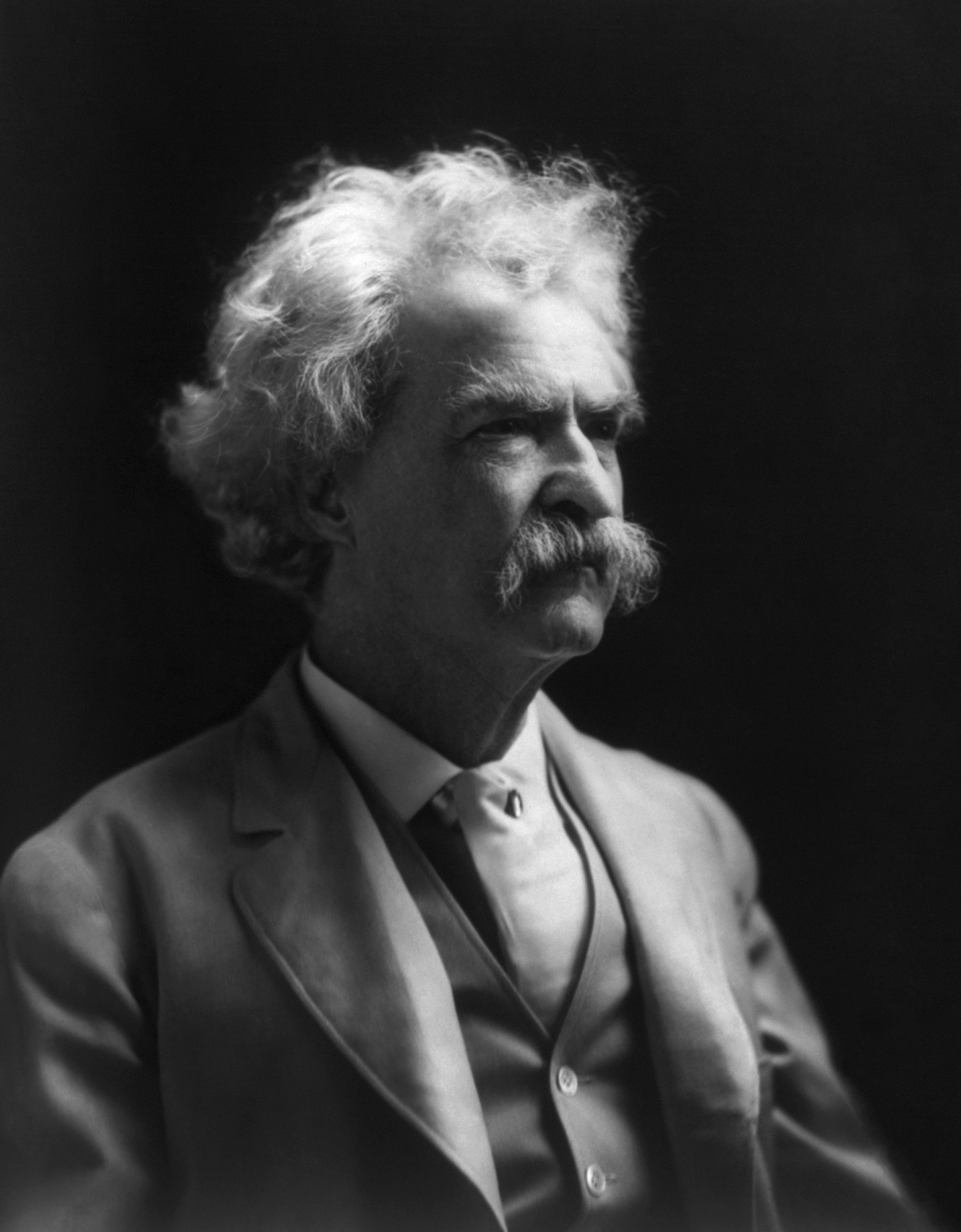
April 21, 1910: Mark Twain dies at age 74

The following events occurred in April 1910:

== April 1, 1910 (Friday) ==
- Lava from Mount Etna destroyed the Italian village of Cavahero, with fifty houses, but the inhabitants were all able to leave beforehand.
- Died: Robert Wilson Patterson Jr., 59, editor of the Chicago Tribune, died of a stroke while at the Bellevue-Stratford Hotel in Philadelphia.

== April 2, 1910 (Saturday) ==
- Both Houses of the Maryland State Legislature passed the Negro Disenfranchisement Bill, revoking the right of African-Americans to vote in state and local elections, on grounds that it had not voted to ratify the 15th Amendment to the United States Constitution. Governor Crothers vetoed the bill on April 8.
- In Paris, Dr. Eugene Doyen announced that he had discovered a germ-destroying medicine, which he called mycolysine. Dr. Doyen claimed that the balm would stop skin cancer.
- Aviator Hubert Le Blon became the sixth person in history to die in an airplane accident, while flying in stormy weather at San Sebastian, Spain.
- Born:
  - Chico Xavier, popular medium in Brazil's spiritism movement; in Minas Gerais; (d. 2002)
  - Arnie Herber, American pro football player and Pro Football Hall of Fame inductee; in Green Bay, Wisconsin (d. 1969)

== April 3, 1910 (Sunday) ==
- Ricardo Jiménez Oreamuno was elected President of Costa Rica by an electoral college, defeating former President Rafael Yglesias Castro by a margin of 832–36.
- While in Rome, former U.S. President Theodore Roosevelt announced that he would not meet with Pope Leo XIII because of the Vatican's request that Roosevelt not meet first with local Methodists. In March, former Vice-President Charles W. Fairbanks declined an audience for the same reason.

== April 4, 1910 (Monday) ==
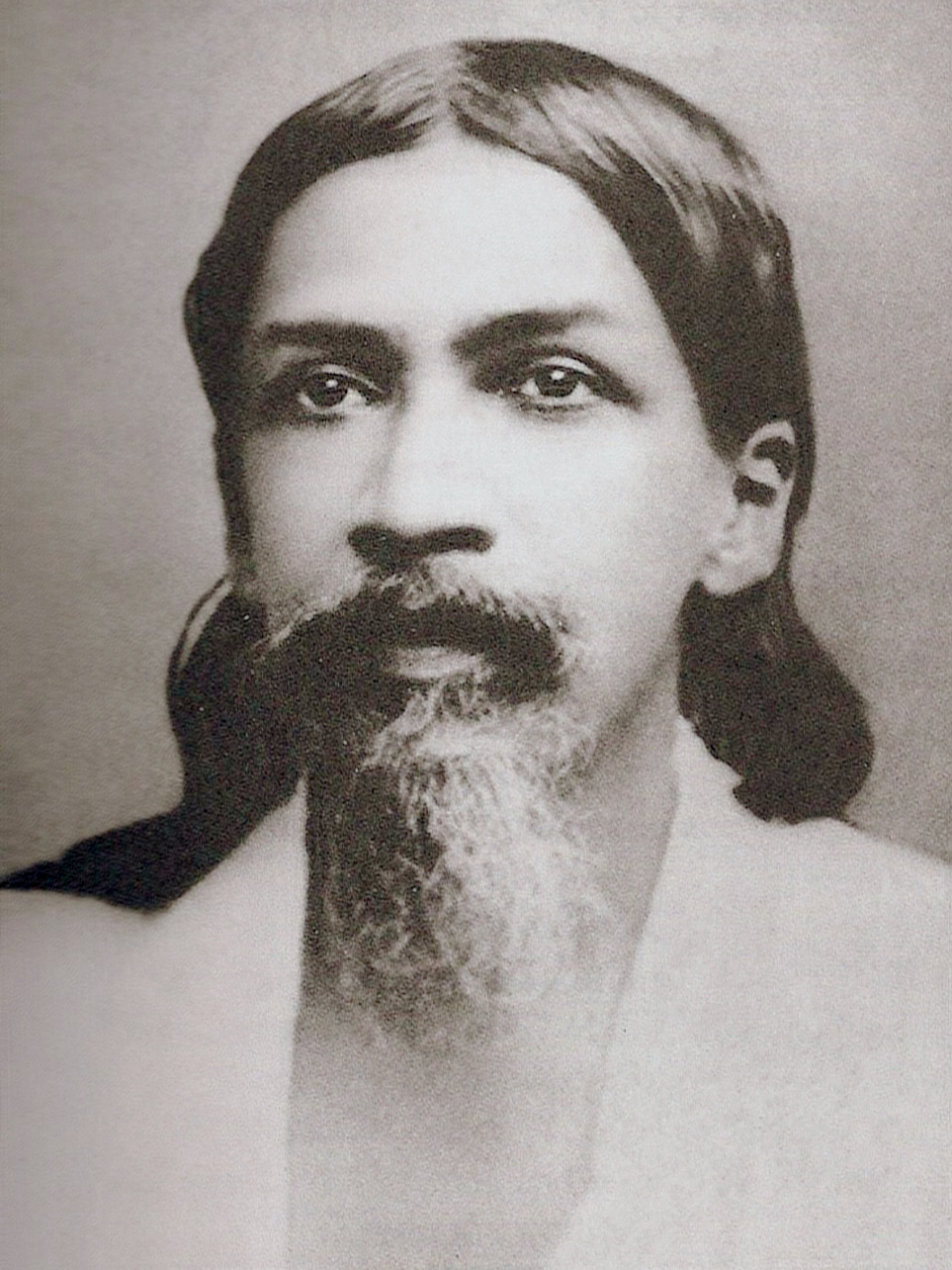
Aurobindo

- False news of attacks on the Ecuadorean embassy in Lima led to riots in Quito and demands for a declaration of war with Peru. The Peruvian fleet mobilized.
- Sri Aurobindo, formerly Aravinda Ghosh, arrived by ship in Pondicherry, at that time a colony in French India. The former activist for the independence of India from the British renounced terrorism in favor of spiritualism, and spent the last forty years of his life writing philosophical works.
- The city of Highland, Indiana, was incorporated.

== April 5, 1910 (Tuesday) ==
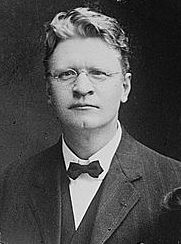
Seidel

- Socialist Emil Seidel was elected Mayor of Milwaukee, Wisconsin. He was the first Socialist Party member to be elected to lead a major American city.
- The Abernathy Boys, Bud, 10, and Temple, 6, set off on their second long-distance journey, by themselves, on horseback. In 1909, they had captured the nation's attention by riding from Tillman County, Oklahoma, to Santa Fe, New Mexico, and back. This time, they decided to visit New York City, a journey of about two months. A monument to the boys was unveiled in Frederick, Oklahoma, in 2006.
- The Trans-Andean Tunnel opened, linking Chile and Argentina by rail.
- The city of Polson, Montana, was incorporated.
- Died: Charles Follis, 31, the first African-American pro football player. In 1904, he was signed to the independent Shelby Blues of Shelby, Ohio.

== April 6, 1910 (Wednesday) ==
- In an appeal of the verdict in the "Brownsville Affair" A military court of inquiry affirmed the convictions of 167 members of the black 25th United States Regiment, on charges of complicity of the 1906 shooting of two white men in Brownsville, Texas, and the men were dishonorably discharged. It was not until 1972, after publication of John D. Weaver's book The Brownsville Raid, that Army reopened the investigation and concluded the men had been innocent.
- Turkish troops moved into Albania, at that time a part of the Ottoman Empire, to suppress a revolt over taxes.

== April 7, 1910 (Thursday) ==
- SMS Moltke, the first Moltke-class battlecruiser for the Imperial German Navy, was launched from Hamburg. The new class of ships had 32 big guns and thicker armor.
- The British House of Commons voted 339–237 in favor of Prime Minister Asquith's legislative veto resolution.

== April 8, 1910 (Friday) ==
- The "Digges Bill", which took away the right of blacks in Maryland to vote in state and local elections, was vetoed by Governor Austin Crothers, not because it was racist, but because it was "impractical". Governor Crothers signed a bill permitting Maryland voters to decide on whether to approve the Digges Amendment to the Maryland Constitution.
- The Los Angeles Motordrome opened in Playa Del Rey, California, housing the a mile long motor race track made of wood, permitting unprecedented speeds. The track, modeled after a velodrome used for bicycle racing, was the first designed for the short lived sport of board track racing, popular up until the 1930s. Caleb Bragg raced one mile in 37.56 seconds, and Barney Oldfield broke that record at 36.23 s. Other races ran from two to 100 miles.

== April 9, 1910 (Saturday) ==
- As part of the process of disestablishment in France, in which formerly state owned church properties were turned over to the general public, the shrine at Lourdes and all of its property were turned over to the ownership of the local commune, to be used for whatever purposes the residents wanted. The council of Lourdes voted unanimously to turn the shrine into a trusteeship, giving authority back to the bishop to use it as he saw fit.
- Born: Nouhak Phoumsavan, President of Laos 1992 to 1998; in Ban Phalouka, Mukdahan province, Thailand (d. 2008)

== April 10, 1910 (Sunday) ==
- The American Interstate Commerce Commission ruled that on Pullman cars on trains, beds on upper berths should be sold for less than those on lower berths.
- Fourteen construction workers at Novice, Texas, were killed instantly when a mixup of signals caused a worker to set off a dynamite charge before the area had been cleared.
- Born
  - Abraham A. Ribicoff, U.S. politician who served as Governor of Connecticut, 1955–1961 and U.S. Senator 1963–1981; in New Britain, Connecticut (d. 1998)
  - Yevgeny Fyodorov, Soviet scientist; in Bendery, Bessarabia Governorate, Russian Empire (now Bender, Republic of Moldova) (d. 1981)
  - Paul Sweezy, American Marxist and founder of Monthly Review; in New York City (d. 2004)

== April 11, 1910 (Monday) ==
- Gifford Pinchot, who had been fired from his job as Chief Forester of the United States by President Taft, conferred with former President Roosevelt while both men were at Porto Maurizio in Italy.
- Moonachie, New Jersey, and Berlin Township, New Jersey, were both incorporated.
- The town of Middleton, Idaho, was incorporated.
- Born:
  - Antonio de Spinola, Portuguese general who restored democracy to Portugal in 1974; in Estremoz (d.1996)
  - Karl Vennberg, Swedish poet; in Blädinge (d. 1995)

== April 12, 1910 (Tuesday) ==
- Duncan Campbell Scott, Canada's Superintendent of Indian Affairs from 1913 to 1932, wrote a letter describing what he referred to as "the final solution of our Indian Problem", declining to address concerns about the higher death rate of Canada's aboriginal people in residential schools. Beginning in the 1920s, Scott oversaw changes in the law requiring all Indian children over the age of seven to be relocated to year-round boarding schools. The letter was first brought to light by Canadian activist Kevin Annett in his book Hidden from History: The Canadian Holocaust (2001). However, this quotation is not verifiable because Mr. Annett did not include sufficient information in the citation to locate the quotation.
- Died: William Graham Sumner, 69, American anthropologist, credited as founder of the concept of ethnocentrism.

== April 13, 1910 (Wednesday) ==
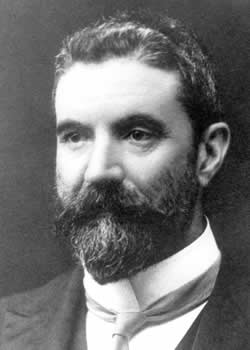
Deakin

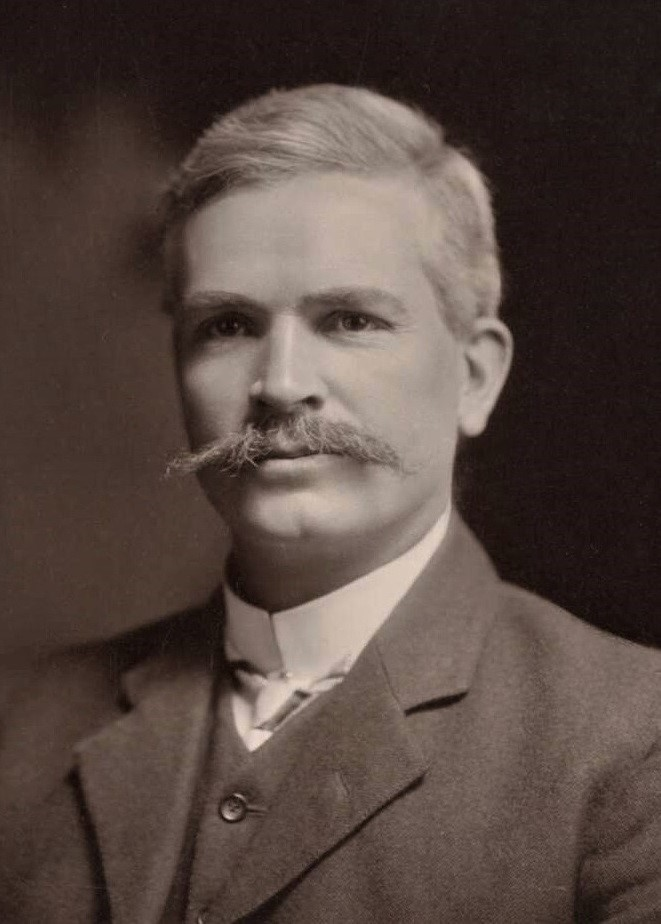
Fisher

- In the Australian federal election, the Australian Labour Party, led by Andrew Fisher, took over control of the Senate and the House of Representatives from Prime Minister Alfred Deakin's Commonwealth Liberal Party. Fisher took office as the fifth Prime Minister of Australia on April 29.
- Governor Malcolm R. Patterson of Tennessee pardoned Duncan Brown Cooper, after Cooper's conviction for the murder of former U.S. Senator Edward Ward Carmack had been affirmed on appeal.

== April 14, 1910 (Thursday) ==
- William H. Taft began the tradition of the President of the United States throwing the ceremonial "first pitch" to open the professional baseball season. The President and Mrs. Taft attended the Washington Senators' opening day game against the Philadelphia Athletics, and Taft threw the ball from the stands to Senators' pitcher Walter Johnson. The Senators won, 3–0.
- The Sperry Gyroscope Company was incorporated in Delaware. The company merged with Remington Rand in 1955 to become Sperry Rand, then Sperry Corporation, and in 1986 merged with Burroughs Corporation to form the Unisys Corporation.
- The town of Mount Rainier, Maryland, was incorporated.

== April 15, 1910 (Friday) ==
- The 1910 United States census was taken as more than 70,000 workers began the enumeration process. The final tally was 92,228,496.
- Japan's "Submarine No. 6" sank in Hiroshima Bay, with a loss of her entire crew of 14, after an outside vent was left open during a dive. For more than two hours, the sailors labored to raise the sub before being overcome by carbon monoxide, events that were described by the commander, Lieutenant Tsutomu Sakuma in a letter that he wrote to the Emperor as death approached, urging him to "study the submarine until it is a perfect machine, absolutely reliable. We can then die without regret."
- The city of Harlingen, Texas, was incorporated.

== April 16, 1910 (Saturday) ==
- Boston Arena, now Matthews Arena, was opened. It served as the first home for the NHL Boston Bruins, the NBA Boston Celtics, and the WHA New England Whalers, and still serves Northeastern University.
- Born: Berton Roueché, American medical writer for The New Yorker; in Kansas City, Missouri; (d. 1994)
- Died: Julien Dupré, 59, French painter

== April 17, 1910 (Sunday) ==
- Rosa Blazek gave birth to a son, Franzl, at the General Hospital in Prague, in the only recorded case of a pregnancy and childbirth for a conjoined twin. Rosa and her sister Josepha were 31 when Rosa became pregnant. Both died in 1922 shortly after moving to the United States.
- The German balloon Delitzch was destroyed after being struck by a lightning bolt at Eisenach, killing the four-man crew on board.
- Born: Ivan Goff, Australian screenwriter known for his co-writing with Ben Roberts on numerous TV and film scripts; in Perth (d. 1999)

== April 18, 1910 (Monday) ==
- The National American Woman Suffrage Association (NAWSA) presented to Congress a petition with 500,000 signatures in favor of granting American women the right to vote. After arriving in a procession of 45 cars (one for each of the United States) at the U.S. Capitol, the suffragists separated the petitions for delivery to their Senators and Representatives, who in turn presented the petitions to the Speaker of the House and to the Vice-President.

== April 19, 1910 (Tuesday) ==
- Paul Ehrlich announced his discovery of "606" (also nicknamed the "magic bullet"), the first medicine that could cure syphilis, in an address at the 1910 gathering of the Congress for Internal Medicine at Wiesbaden.

== April 20, 1910 (Wednesday) ==
- Halley's Comet reached perihelion, making its closest approach to the Sun since 1835, and was visible to the naked eye for the first time since its return to the Solar System. Some viewers on the island of Curaçao had been able to discern the comet in pre-dawn hours on the 19th. The comet remained visible through the rest of May as it traveled away from the Solar System, not to return until 1986.
- French aviator Roger Sommer became the first person to carry five persons on an airplane, when he brought four passengers along for a five-minute flight at Charleville.
- Forty coal miners were killed near Mulga, Alabama, in an explosion. Two days later, another 18 miners were killed near Amsterdam, Ohio.
- Samuel J. Scott, a 15-year-old boy working in Belfast on the construction of the RMS Titanic, fell from a ladder and died of a fractured skull. He was the first of eight people who died on the Titanic prior to its wreck two years later in April 1912.
- Born: Robert F. Wagner, Jr., Mayor of New York City from 1954 to 1965; in Yorkville, Manhattan neighborhood in New York City (d. 1991)

== April 21, 1910 (Thursday) ==
- Samuel Langhorne Clemens, beloved to millions of readers for his writings under the pen name Mark Twain, died at the age of 74 at his home in Redding, Connecticut. Twain, who had angina pectoris, went into a coma at 3:00 pm and was dead by 6:30. Appropriately, his last words were handwritten rather than spoken, a note to his daughter Clara: "Give me my glasses".

== April 22, 1910 (Friday) ==
- Eighteen coal miners were killed in an explosion near Amsterdam, Ohio.

== April 23, 1910 (Saturday) ==
- The 1910 World's Fair was opened at Brussels by Belgium's King Albert, and operated until November.
- A fire destroyed much of Lake Charles, Louisiana, leaving 2,000 people homeless.
- Theodore Roosevelt made his The Man in the Arena speech.
- Born: Simone Simon, French actress; in Béthune (d. 2005)

== April 24, 1910 (Sunday) ==
- Parliamentary elections were held in France, resulting in a slight increase in the ruling party majority. Aristide Briand remained as Prime Minister.
- The 200 African-American residents of Coleman, Texas, mostly employees of the Santa Fe Railroad and their families, were forced to leave town permanently by the White population.

== April 25, 1910 (Monday) ==
- Charles Evans Hughes, the Governor of New York, was nominated to the United States Supreme Court by President William Howard Taft. Both Taft and Hughes would lose to Woodrow Wilson in presidential election contests (1912 and 1916), and both men would later become Chief Justice of the United States.
- The town of Coupeville, Washington, county seat for Island County, was incorporated.

== April 26, 1910 (Tuesday) ==
- William E. Glasscock, the Governor of West Virginia, proclaimed that the second Sunday in May would be recognized as Mother's Day, after Anna Jarvis of Grafton had lobbied for three years for recognition. Other states followed West Virginia's lead, followed by other nations.
- Died:
  - Bjørnstjerne Bjørnson, 77, Norwegian poet and novelist; winner of 1903 Nobel Prize in Literature
  - Wellington Smith, 68, the millionaire president of Smith Paper Company, was killed in a freak accident when a folding bed collapsed upon him while he was sleeping.

== April 27, 1910 (Wednesday) ==
- A herd of nine elephants rampaged through Danville, Illinois, after escaping from a train bringing a circus to town. Several people were injured, one seriously, and 100 houses were damaged.
- Juan Vincente Gomez was unanimously elected President of Venezuela by that nation's Congress. Gomez, who had staged a coup the previous November, had resigned on April 19 pending the election. For eight days, Constantin Guererro served as Acting President.
- Born:
  - Chiang Ching-kuo, Prime Minister of Republic of China (Taiwan) 1972–1978, President 1978–1988; in Fenghua, Zhejiang Province (d. 1988)
  - Jim Zyntell, American football player for the Giants and Eagles, and the last, alphabetically, among all NFL players; in Boston (d. 1992)

== April 28, 1910 (Thursday) ==
- The House of Lords approved the 1909 "People's Budget" for the United Kingdom, without demurrer, passing the same into law. The Lords had rejected the budget the previous November 30, leading to a governmental crisis and reforms in their power.
- Louis Paulhan won a £10,000 prize from the Daily Mail by becoming the first person to fly an airplane from London to Manchester. Claude Grahame-White, who was making his second attempt at the prize, had taken off at the same time as Paulhan.
- The city of San Francisco began a fund-raising campaign for the 1915 World's Fair.
- The town of Richland, Washington, was incorporated. For its first 30 years, it had only a few hundred residents until the United States government built up residences for employees of the Hanford Nuclear Reservation.
- Died: Edouard Van Beneden, 64, Belgian geneticist

== April 29, 1910 (Friday) ==
- In Canberra, Andrew Fisher was sworn in as the fifth Prime Minister of Australia, replacing Alfred Deakin.
- The town of Brewster, Washington, was incorporated.

== April 30, 1910 (Saturday) ==
- The Vice-Governor of the Belgian Congo ordered the introduction of the "medical passport", mandatory for all black African subjects, ostensibly to combat the spread of sleeping sickness. Formerly, a document (feuille de route) was required only for persons travelling outside their home area. The medical passport was mandatory for all residents, to be presented upon request to any colonial official, an idea picked up by other colonies.
- In the battle of Kačanik Pass, Turkish troops defeated Albanian rebels.
- Born: Srirangam Srinivasarao, Indian Telugu language poet nicknamed "SriSri"; in Visakhapatnam (d. 1983)
