= September 1909 =

Month in 1909

<<	September 1909					>>
Su	Mo	Tu	We	Th	Fr	Sa
			1	2	3	4
5	6	7	8	9	10	11
12	13	14	15	16	17	18
19	20	21	22	23	24	25
26	27	28	29	30

The following events occurred in September 1909:

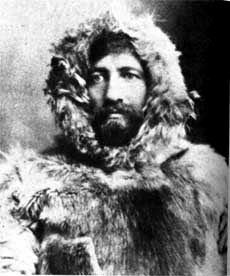
September 1, 1909: Frederick Cook announces he was the first to reach the North Pole (on April 21, 1908)

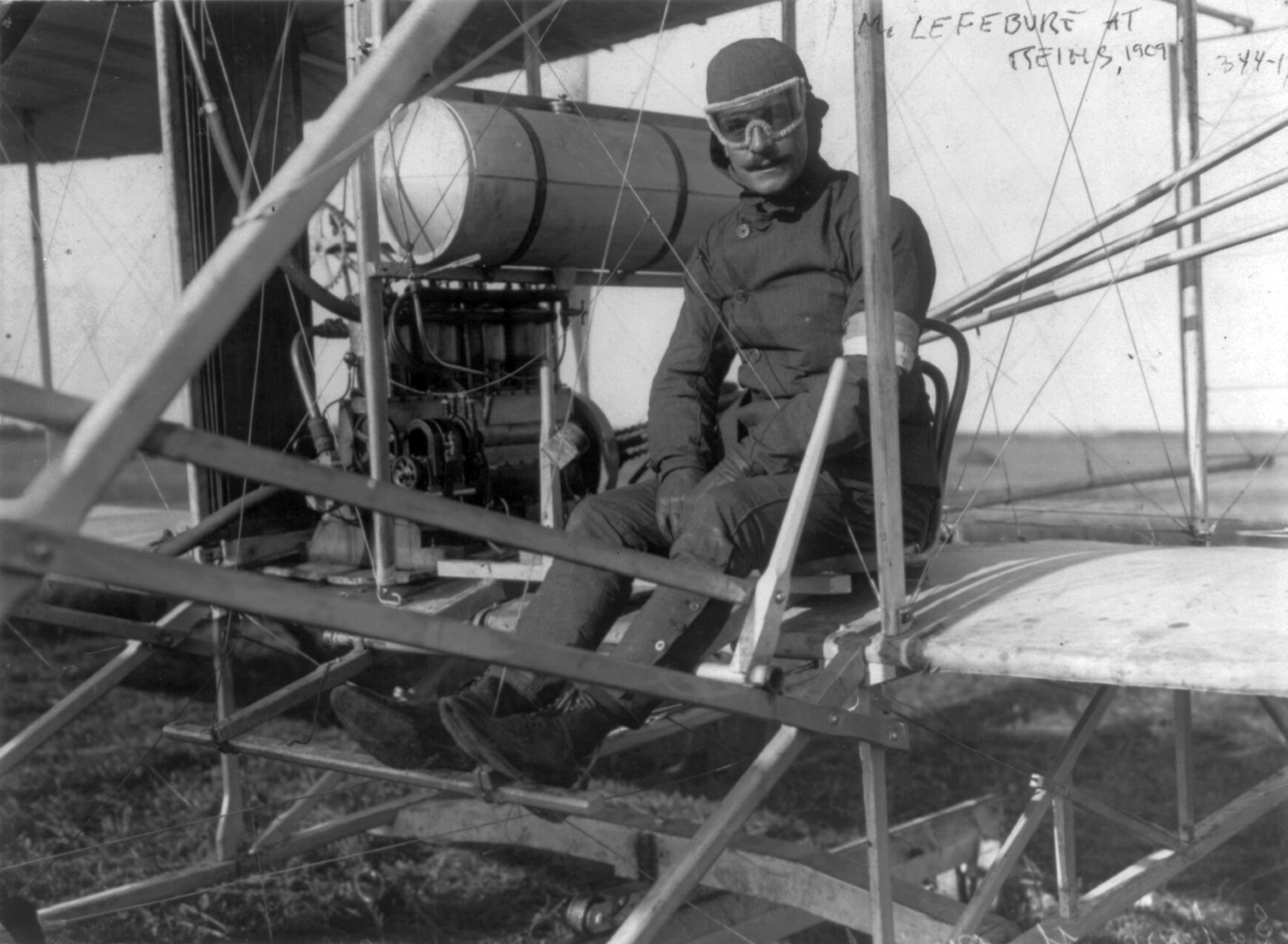
September 7, 1909: Eugène Lefebvre, becomes the first pilot, and second person overall, to die in an airplane crash

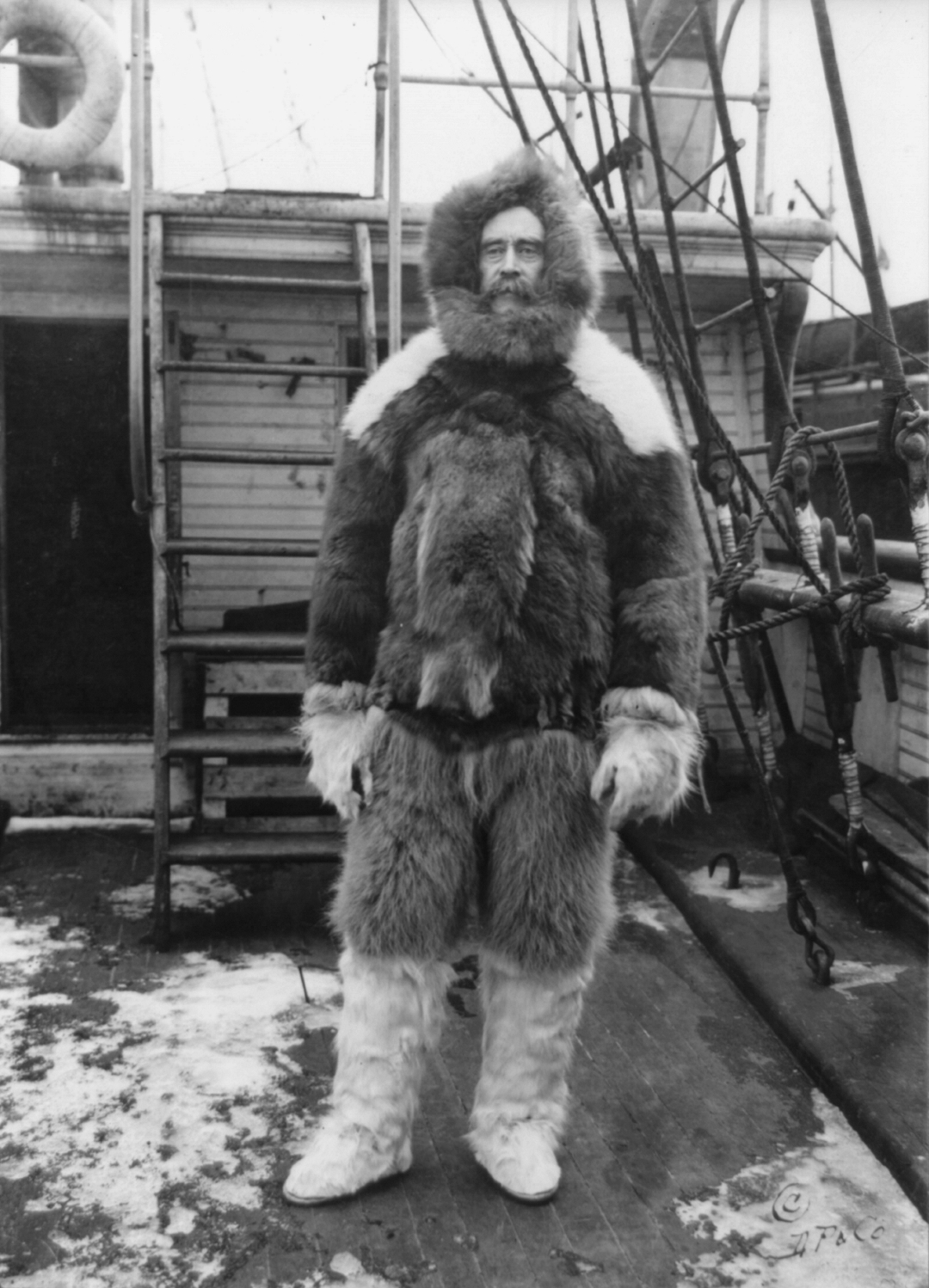
September 6, 1909: Robert Peary announces he was the first to reach the North Pole (on April 6, 1909)

== September 1, 1909 (Wednesday) ==
- In Brussels, Belgium, the Leconte Observatory received a message cabled from Lerwick in the Shetland Islands: "Reached north pole April 21, 1908. Discovered land far north. Return to Copenhagen by steamer Hans Eged. (Signed) FREDERICK COOK". Reaction to the news was mixed. The New York Herald, which had purchased the rights, published Dr. Cook's story the next day. Meanwhile, Robert Peary, who had reached the North Pole on April 6, 1909, was still en route to a telegraph station.
- Baguio was incorporated. At an elevation of 5,100 ft (1,500 m), the city's cool temperatures made it the "Summer Capital of the Philippines". The American Governor-General resided there during Manila's hottest months.

== September 2, 1909 (Thursday) ==
- The New York Herald published its copyrighted story, "My Conquest of the Pole", by Dr. Frederick A. Cook. Dr. Cook wrote, "At last we had pierced the boreal center and the flag had been raised to the coveted breezes of the North Pole. The day was April 21, 1908. The sun indicated local noon, but that was a negative problem, for here all meridians meet. With a step it was possible to go from one part of the globe to the opposite side ... North, east and west had vanished. It was south in every direction, but the compass pointing to the magnetic pole was as useful as ever." The Herald had paid Cook $25,000 for exclusive rights to his story, which was cabled from the American consulate in Copenhagen.

== September 3, 1909 (Friday) ==
- The ferry boat Magnolia was struck by another ferry, the Nettie and split in two, sinking immediately in Sheepshead Bay at New York. All 33 persons on board survived a difficult rescue.

== September 4, 1909 (Saturday) ==
- The first Boy Scout Rally was held, bringing 11,000 boys to Crystal Palace in London. Scout founder Sir Robert Baden-Powell was approached by a group of girls who asked him to create a similar program for them. Agnes Baden-Powell, Robert's sister, set about the task of creating the Girl Guides and, later, the Girl Scouts.
- The Chinese-Korean border was agreed upon between the governments of Japan (which had made Korea its protectorate) and China in the Gando Convention treaty. The boundary is the Tumen River and the Shiyishui stream.
- Playwright Clyde Fitch died two days after an emergency appendectomy, while multimillionaire William Singer died ten days after a fatal automobile accident. Fitch, who had dreaded the prospect of surgery, had weathered two previous attacks of appendicitis and had never had his appendix taken out. Singer was, up to that time, the wealthiest person to have ever died in a car accident. He had been thrown from his car in an August 25 mishap.
- The first airplane flight in Germany was made by Orville Wright at Tempelhof.

== September 5, 1909 (Sunday) ==
- Tsar Nicholas II arrived in Sevastopol, where an attempt on his life would have been made, but for a missed train. Julia Lublinskaia Merzheevskaia, also known as Elena Lukiens, was going to throw a bomb at the ruler of all the Russias, but she failed to get to the railroad station in time.
- The Eduard Bohlen ran aground off the coast of Namibia's Skeleton Coast on September 5, 1909, in a thick fog. Currently the wreck lies in the sand a quarter mile from the shoreline.
- Born:
  - Nicholas Bhengu, South African evangelist, in Entumeni; (d. 1985);
  - Yusuf Dadoo, South African Communist activist, in Krugersdorp; (d. 1983)
  - Archie Jackson, Scottish-born Australian cricketer; in Rutherglen, South Lanarkshire; (d. 1933)

== September 6, 1909 (Monday) ==
- Arctic explorer Robert Peary telegraphed the first report of his discovery, on April 6, of the North Pole. The transmission to the New York Times, which had purchased the rights to his story, was from Indian Harbor at Labrador, where the ship Roosevelt had brought him. Peary's wire to the Times read, "I have the pole, April sixth. Expect arrive Chateau Bay September seventh. Secure control wire for me there and arrange expedite transmission big story. PEARY." At that time, Peary learned that the previous week, explorer Frederick Cook had claimed to have reached the North Pole on April 21, 1908.
- Born: Valentin Anatolievich Zmorovich, Soviet mathematician (d. 1994)

== September 7, 1909 (Tuesday) ==
- Eugene Lefebvre became the first airplane pilot to be killed in a plane crash. Lefebvre was flying at Port-Aviation (often called "Juvisy Airfield") at Viry-Châtillon in France and his plane was about 20 feet (6.1 m) off the ground when "suddenly, without any apparent reason, it tilted sharply downward and propelled by the force of the motor, struck the ground with great violence." Lefebvre was the second person, but first pilot, to die in an airplane accident. The first person killed had been Thomas Selfridge, who had flown as a passenger on a plane with Orville Wright the previous year.
- Born: Elia Kazan, American film director, as Elias Kazanjoglous, in Istanbul; (d. 2003)
- Died: Henry Brown Blackwell, 84, British-born American reformer

== September 8, 1909 (Wednesday) ==
- Born: Max Blecher, Romanian author, in Botoşani; (d. 1938)

== September 9, 1909 (Thursday) ==
- The National Library of China was created, to be housed at the Guanghua Temple (Beijing). The library opened to the public on August 27, 1912.
- The 1,600-foot-long (490 m) Santa Monica Pier opened to the public in Santa Monica, California.
- Died: E.H. Harriman, 61, American railroad magnate

== September 10, 1909 (Friday) ==
- Lord Kitchener retired as Commander of the Indian Army after seven years, having completed reorganization of the British and Indian units into a more efficient force. Kitchener was promoted to the rank of Field Marshal the next day and set off on a world tour.
- The United States Post Office Department announced a new regulation excusing letter carriers from delivering the mail "at residences where vicious dogs are permitted to run at large".

== September 11, 1909 (Saturday) ==
- Maximilian Wolf became the first astronomer to confirm the return of Halley's Comet, last seen from the Earth in 1835, spotting it on a photographic plate. Wolff's photo was actually the fourth one taken of the comet. Subsequent searches found that Halley's had been captured on a photo taken on August 24 at the observatory in Helwan, Egypt.
- Born: William H. Natcher, U.S. Congressman 1953–1994, in Bowling Green, Kentucky; known for never missing a vote in Congress, with 18,401 consecutive votes (d. 1994)

== September 12, 1909 (Sunday) ==
- In Germany, chemist Fritz Hofmann applied for a patent for the first successful method of producing synthetic rubber. "A Method for the Preparation of Artificial Rubber" described methods of heat polymerization of isoprene at a temperature under 250 °C (482 °F) to create a substitute for rubber, from which German patent No. 250690 was issued.
- In Fes, Morocco, rebel leader El Roghi was put to death by order of the Sultan. The rebel had been placed on public view in an iron cage until the French Consul protested the torture of the rebels. It was reported later that El Roghi had been burned alive after an attempt to feed him to lions had failed.
- Dr. Willis C. Hoover and his 37 followers were expelled from the Methodist Church in Valparaíso, Chile, and organized the Pentecostal Methodist Church of Chile. By the end of the 20th century, there were two million Pentecostals in Chile, 20 percent of the nation's population.
- Emiliano Zapata began his revolutionary career when the city leaders of San Miguel Anenecuilco, in the Mexican province of Morelos, selected him to recover lands owned by the village.

== September 13, 1909 (Monday) ==
- Robert Falcon Scott announced that he was going to raise funds to become the first person to reach the South Pole. "The main object of the expedition is to reach the South Pole and secure for the British Empire the honour of that achievement", Scott told reporters. Scott would reach the South Pole in 1912, only to find that Norwegian explorer Roald Amundsen had gotten there a few weeks earlier. Demoralized and down to rations, Scott and his party died in the Antarctic before they could return home.
- John King, who had won the Medal of Honor for heroism on the U.S.S. Vicksburg following a boiler accident, earned a second Medal of Honor for heroism after a boiler accident on the U.S.S. Salem.

== September 14, 1909 (Tuesday) ==
- On the eve of a 13,000-mile (21,000 km) nationwide tour, U.S. President William Howard Taft announced in Boston his support for a national bank, as proposed by the National Monetary Commission, chaired by Senator Nelson Aldrich. "Our banking and monetary system is a patched up affair, which satisfies nobody", the President said in a speech at a banquet for the Boston Chamber of Commerce, and endorsed "a central bank of issue, which shall control the reserve and exercise a power to meet and control the casual stringency which from time to time will come." Following the Aldrich Commission proposal, the Federal Reserve Act was passed in 1913.
- Charles Pinkney Jr. of the Dayton Veterans was fatally injured after being struck by a pitch thrown by Casey Hageman of the Grand Rapids Stags, in a Central League game played in Dayton, Ohio. Pinkney, who had hit a home run in the first game of a doubleheader, died the next day following surgery. Hageman later played major league baseball for the Red Sox, the Cardinals and the Cubs.
- Born: Sir Peter Scott, British ornithologist and painter (d. 1989)

== September 15, 1909 (Wednesday) ==
- Pilot Georges Legagneux made the first airplane flight in Russia, demonstrating the French-built Voisin biplane at the Khodynka Field near Moscow.
- The Ford Motor Company was held to have infringed upon an 1895 patent held by inventor George B. Selden. Selden had founded the Association of Licensed Automobile Manufacturers and had required all automakers to receive an ALAM license. After ALAM denied a license to Henry Ford in 1903, Ford Motor manufactured the automobiles anyway and was sued. The judgment, by federal judge Charles M. Hough, enjoined Ford Motor from further manufacture of automobiles, but was reversed on January 11, 1911, by an appellate court. The ALAM did not pursue the injunction further.
- The Yuma Territorial Prison was closed after 33 years. Located in the desert of Yuma, Arizona, the federal prison had housed convicts from across the nation in temperatures that gave it the nickname of the American "Devil's Island".
- Born:
  - Jean Batten, New Zealand-born female aviator, in Rotorua (d. 1982)
  - Tan Jiazhen, Chinese geneticist, in Cixi City (d. 2008)

== September 16, 1909 (Thursday) ==
- Adolf Hitler, 20, moved out of his lodgings at Sechshauserstrasse 58 in Vienna with his savings exhausted, no income and no forwarding address, then spent the next several months homeless. He would later describe autumn 1909 as "an endlessly bitter time".

== September 17, 1909 (Friday) ==
- The City of Granger, Washington, was incorporated.
- The first streetcar crossed the Queensboro Bridge from Long Island City into Manhattan on a half-hour trip that started at 3:30

== September 18, 1909 (Saturday) ==
- The largest crowd to ever watch a baseball game, up to that time, turned out in Shibe Park as 35,409 spectators watched the Philadelphia Athletics beat the visiting Detroit Tigers, 2–0, on the pitching of future Hall of Famer Charles "Chief" Bender. The A's were second to the Tigers in the American League pennant race.

== September 19, 1909 (Sunday) ==
- Physician Friedrich Dessauer succeeded in making a clear x-ray image with 0.03 seconds of exposure, creating "x-ray cinematography". Up to eight x-rays could be taken during the space of a heartbeat, and then viewed in succession as if on a film. However, the process required exposure of the human body to large, multiple bursts of x-ray radiation.
- Born: Ferry Porsche, Austrian automotive designer, in Wiener Neustadt (d. 1998)

== September 20, 1909 (Monday) ==
- Britain passed the South Africa Act 1909, effective May 31, 1910, which united the British colonies of the Cape of Good Hope and Natal with the Transvaal and the Orange River Colony, Britain's conquests in the Boer War, to create the Union of South Africa.
- The Grand Isle Hurricane of 1909 struck Grand Isle, Louisiana, then destroyed much of New Orleans. An estimated 350 people were killed by the Category 4 hurricane.

== September 21, 1909 (Tuesday) ==
- Frederick Cook returned to a hero's welcome in New York City, celebrated as the discoverer of the North Pole by the New York Herald.
- Oakland resident Feng Ru (Fong Joe Guey), a native of Guangdong in China, flew an airplane that he had constructed himself. Feng Ru is now celebrated as China's first aircraft designer and aviator.
- The Shoshone Cavern National Monument was created by executive order of President Taft. Congress removed the cavern from the National Park System on May 17, 1954, and transferred the park to the city of Cody, Wyoming.
- John Albert Johnson, the first native of Minnesota to serve as its Governor, died suddenly at age 48 following intestinal surgery. The popular Governor was mourned nationwide, and a biographer noted "Never was such general grief known in Minnesota." Johnson was succeeded by Adolph O. Eberhart, a native of Sweden.
- Young Albert Einstein presented in public for the first time his theory of relativity, published in 1905. The work that has revolutionized physics then received a rather cool reception from his peers. In the gym of Andrä school, where were held the meeting of the society of natural scientists and physicians from Germany, the famous formula E = mc^{2}, energy equals mass multiplied by the speed of light squared, was chalked on the blackboard.
- Born: Kwame Nkrumah, first President of Ghana, 1960–66; as Francis Nwia Kofi Nkrumah in Nkroful (d. 1972)

== September 22, 1909 (Wednesday) ==
- Aviator Ferdinand Ferber was killed in Boulogne, France, when his airplane crashed during testing. Ferber became the fourth person, and second pilot, to die in an airplane crash.
- In the city of Valence, Drôme, France, the murderers Berruyer, David and Liotard were guillotined in a public execution. The three men had tortured and murdered at least 12 victims, and committed 200 robberies.

== September 23, 1909 (Thursday) ==
- The British weekly magazine Truth first exposed the atrocities committed, by management of the British-owned Peruvian Amazon Company, against the indigenous people who were in its employ. Walter Hardenburg, an American traveler who had witnessed the practices, authored the article, entitled "The Devil's Paradise — A British-Owned Congo". Outrage by the British public led to an investigation by the House of Commons and the disbanding of the corporation.
- Near Montrose, Colorado, President Taft opened the Gunnison Tunnel, "setting in operation the greatest irrigation project the United States Government ever has undertaken".
- The Arctic Club of America honored Dr. Frederick Cook as the "discoverer" of the North Pole, at a banquet in his honor at The Waldorf-Astoria Hotel in New York, with 1,185 people in attendance. Cook's claim, that he had been the first person to reach the North Pole would be rejected three months later by an investigating commission of the University of Copenhagen.

== September 24, 1909 (Friday) ==
- The world did not come to an end as predicted. Led by Robert B. Swan, 300 members of the "Triune Immersionists" gathered in West Duxbury, Massachusetts, in anticipation of 10:00 a.m., when the crust of the Earth would peel off, destroying the wicked and permitting the righteous to survive. After 10:00 passed without incident, the prediction was revised to sometime within the 24 hours after 6:00 p.m.
- Nikolai Rimsky-Korsakov's 15th and final opera, Le Coq d'Or (The Golden Cockerel or Zolotoy Petushok) premiered at Moscow's Private Opera, more than a year after Rimsky-Korsakov's death.
- Born: Carl Sigman, American songwriter ("It's All In The Game"), in Brooklyn; (d. 2000)

== September 25, 1909 (Saturday) ==
- Sunspot activity produced a magnetic storm that disrupted telegraph communications across the world, starting at 1200 noon GMT (7 am EST).

== September 26, 1909 (Sunday) ==
- At a ranch near Banning, California, a Chemehuevi Indian known only as "Willie Boy" shot and killed his girlfriend's father, William Mike, then fled with her into the desert. When Carlotta Mike's body was discovered days later, the manhunt became nationwide news. Willie Boy eluded his pursuers and survived in the desert for 11 days before killing himself on October 7. The story was recounted in Harry Lawton's 1960 novel Willie Boy: A Desert Manhunt, and later in the 1969 film Tell Them Willie Boy Is Here with Robert Redford, Katherine Ross and Robert Blake (as Willie Boy).

== September 27, 1909 (Monday) ==
- President Taft created the first American oil reserve, withdrawing 3,041,000 acres (12,310 km^{2}) of public lands in California and Wyoming from further claims, and reserving the oil for use by the United States Navy. Ten days earlier, U.S. Geological Survey Director George Otis Smith had warned Secretary of the Interior Richard A. Ballinger that oil lands were being claimed so quickly that they would be unavailable within a few months. "After that", Smith warned, "the government will be obliged to repurchase the very oil that it has practically given away." In 1910, Congress passed the Pickett Act, which gave the President the authority to set aside federally owned resources as necessary for public purposes.
- Died: Gyula Donáth, 59, Hungarian sculptor

== September 28, 1909 (Tuesday) ==
- Union members were locked out of their job at the Triangle Shirtwaist Company in New York. After strikebreakers roughed up women on the picket line, 20,000 more of the city's garment workers went on a strike that lasted until February 15, 1910. The strikers were not able to win on their demand to stop management's practice of locking the workers inside during business hours, a factor in the deaths of 146 Triangle employees on March 25, 1911.
- Born:
  - Al Capp, American cartoonist ("Li'l Abner"); as Alfred Caplin in New Haven (d. 1979)
  - Paidi Jairaj, film actor in India; in Hyderabad (d. 2000)

== September 29, 1909 (Wednesday) ==
- Wilbur Wright gave millions of New York and New Jersey residents their first view of an airplane as part of the Hudson-Fulton Celebration. Wright took off from Governors Island at 10:18 a.m., then flew around the Statue of Liberty and returned at 10:25.
- Died: Vladimir Vidrić, 34, Croatian poet

== September 30, 1909 (Thursday) ==
- Mohammad Ali Shah Qajar, who had been deposed as Shah of Persia, went into exile to Russia, sailing from the Iranian port of Bandar-e Anzali on the steamer General Skobeleff to Petrovsk. In Odessa, he plotted to regain his throne, with one unsuccessful attempt in 1911.
