= August 1909 =

Month in 1909

<<	August 1909					>>
Su	Mo	Tu	We	Th	Fr	Sa
1	2	3	4	5	6	7
8	9	10	11	12	13	14
15	16	17	18	19	20	21
22	23	24	25	26	27	28
29	30	31

The following events occurred in August 1909:

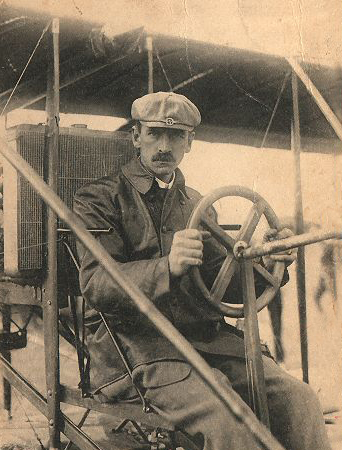
August 29, 1909: Glenn Curtiss wins world's first airplane race, after being sued by the Wright Brothers and almost being in the first midair collision

== August 1, 1909 (Sunday) ==
- The "Semana Tragica" or "tragic week" ended as the Spanish government restored order in Barcelona and other areas of Catalonia. In seven days that began on July 26 with anti-war protests and a strike in Barcelona, hundreds of people were killed in fighting.

== August 2, 1909 (Monday) ==
- The United States Army accepted the delivery of the Wright Military Flyer as "Army Aeroplane Number 1", and hired Wilbur and Orville Wright to train the first two pilots in operation of the machine. Lts. Frank P. Lahm and Frederick E. Humphreys began instruction in October.
- The first Lincoln cents were put into circulation by the U.S. Mint.

== August 3, 1909 (Tuesday) ==
- General Ramón González Valencia was selected as the 12th President of Colombia, to fill the remaining year of the term of Rafael Reyes. González had been Reyes's Vice-President, but had been fired in 1905 by Reyes, who then abolished the office.
- The Silver Dart, Canada's first airplane, was destroyed when it crashed into a hill.

== August 4, 1909 (Wednesday) ==
- In Sweden, a lockout began of 80,000 workers in the paper industry, and the iron and steel industries. The Swedish Labor Federation called for a strike of 124,000 workers, and after a secondary strike, 285,000 of the nation's 460,000 non-agricultural workers were off the job. The Federation called off the secondary strike on September 11; the lockout of ironworkers lasted until November.
- Born:
  - Glenn Cunningham, American track star, who overcame a childhood injury and held the world record for running the mile (1934–1937); in Atlanta, Kansas (d. 1988)
  - Saunders Mac Lane, American mathematician and co-creator of category theory; in Taftville, Connecticut (d. 2005)
  - Roberto Burle Marx, Brazilian architect; in São Paulo (d. 1994)

== August 5, 1909 (Thursday) ==
- The Payne–Aldrich Tariff Act was signed into law by President William Taft at 5:07 p.m., after passing the Senate 54–38. The new rules for a federal corporate tax would take effect at midnight. In a statement, Taft said "The corporation tax is a just and equitable excise measure, which it is hoped will produce a sufficient amount to prevent a deficit", and that the law provided "that degree of publicity and regulation which the tendency in corporate enterprises in the last twenty years has shown to be necessary", and added that the law "will constitute an important and which incidentally will secure valuable statistics and information".
- The British steamer SS Maori sank off Cape Town, killing 32 people, although most of the passengers and crew were able to evacuate to shore. One hundred years later, the wreckage is still popular for scuba divers.
- The first public execution in Paris in 15 years attracted a large crowd despite being held at 4:30 a.m. with short notice. M. Duchemin, who had murdered his mother in 1906, was guillotined in front of the Sante Prison.
- In Atlanta, the Georgia State Senate voted 37–2 against considering the proposed 16th Amendment to the U.S. Constitution, which would authorize an income tax. Georgia ratified the amendment the following year.
- Died: Miguel Antonio Caro, 65, President of Colombia, 1894–1898

== August 6, 1909 (Friday) ==
- Vincenzo Sabatassae, leader of the "Black Hand Gang" of Connecticut, was sentenced to 28 years in prison, and his fellow gangmembers were handed jail terms ranging from 3 to 25 years. The gang, which had terrorized the Italian-American residents in and around New Haven for three years, was caught after kidnapping a man in Wallingford. In pronouncing sentence, the New Haven judge described Sabatassae as the worst criminal with whom he ever came in contact.
- Alice Huyler Ramsey arrived in San Francisco to become the first woman to drive across the United States, having left New York on June 18.

== August 7, 1909 (Saturday) ==
- U.S. President William Howard Taft arrived at the "Summer White House" in Beverly, Massachusetts, on the presidential train car Olympia which traveled as part of the "Federal Express" from Washington to Boston. The rest of the government went on vacation as well, with Vice-President Sherman going home to Utica, New York, House Speaker Cannon home at Danville, Illinois, and all but two Cabinet officials staying in Washington.

== August 8, 1909 (Sunday) ==
- Mary MacKillop, the co-founder of the Sisters of St Joseph of the Sacred Heart, died in North Sydney, Australia, following a stroke. On January 19, 1995, she became the first native Australian to be beatified by the Roman Catholic Church.
- Lumber magnate George Van Dyke and his chauffeur, Frederick B. Hodgdon, were killed in a freak accident at Riverside, Massachusetts. Van Dyke had directed Hodgdon to drive to a cliff overlooking the Connecticut River, to watch logs being shipped. When they prepared to leave, Hodgdon pulled the wrong lever and the car went over the 75-foot-high (23 m) precipice.
- Born: Charles Lyttelton, 10th Viscount Cobham, British cricketer and Governor-General of New Zealand, 1957–1962; in Kensington, London (d. 1977)

== August 9, 1909 (Monday) ==
- Alabama became the first state to ratify the proposed Sixteenth Amendment to the United States Constitution, when the state senate unanimously approved the resolution for a federal income tax. The state house had unanimously approved the proposal on August 2. Governor Comer signed the resolution on August 17, making the process complete.
- One week after the Lincoln cent had been released to the public, the U.S. Mint halted production of the so-called "V.D.B. pennies", which had the initials of designer Victor David Brenner. An estimated 22,350,000 of the pennies had been put into circulation. The San Francisco Mint made 500,000 such pennies and the 1909-S VDB Lincoln Head Cent can sell for more than $2,000.
- Born:
  - Yūji Koseki, Japanese composer active term from 1930 to 1989, known for the 1937 military march "Roei no Uta ("Song of the Camp"), the 1964 Tokyo Olympic March, and Nagasaki no Kane ("The Bells of Nagasaki"), said to have written 5,000 songs; in Fukushima City, Honshu (d. 1989)
  - Adam von Trott zu Solz, German lawyer, diplomat and opponent of Adolf Hitler; in Potsdam (executed 1944).
  - V. K. Gokak, author of the epic Bharatha Sindhu Rashmi and recipient of India's Jnanpith Award; in Savanur State, British India (now in Karnataka state) (d. 1992)

== August 10, 1909 (Tuesday) ==
- Howard R. Hughes, Sr. was granted two patents (No. 930,758 and No. 930,759) for the Sharp-Hughes Rock Bit, a dual-cone rotary drill bit that revolutionized well-drilling and created the fortune that would be inherited by his billionaire son, Howard Hughes.
- The town of Clay Center, Kansas, was panicked by eleven elephants owned by the Hagenbach-Wallace Circus. For two hours, the beasts moved through the streets and alleys of the town before being recaptured.
- Born:
  - Mohammed V, Sultan of Morocco 1927–1953 and King of Morocco 1957–1961; in Rabat (d. 1961)
  - Leo Fender, electric guitar inventor and amp manufacturer; in Anaheim, California (d. 1991)
- Died: Bob Womack, 65, who discovered the richest vein of gold in Colorado, but died penniless

== August 11, 1909 (Wednesday) ==
- SOS, the international Morse code signal for distress, was first used to call for rescue. The S.S. Arapahoe lost power off of Cape Hatteras, North Carolina, and was rescued 36 hours later. Wireless operator R.J. Vosburgh alternated the new signal with the former distress call, CQD.

== August 12, 1909 (Thursday) ==
- Harry K. Thaw, whose 1906 murder of Stanford White created a national sensation, was kept in custody after a judge rejected his bid to be released from a hospital for the criminally insane. Justice Mills of the court in White Plains, New York, concluded that Thaw continued to suffer from paranoia and delusions. Thaw would remain in asylums until 1924, and lived until 1947.
- The Briggs & Stratton Company began producing its first engines.
- Died: Besarion Jughashvili, 59, father of Joseph Stalin, died of cirrhosis of the liver

== August 13, 1909 (Friday) ==
- Juan Vicente Gómez was sworn in as the 38th President of Venezuela. As Vice-President, Gomez had been governing the nation since December 19, when President Cipriano Castro had gone to Europe for medical treatment.
- The towns of Tehachapi, California, and Twisp, Washington, were both incorporated.

== August 14, 1909 (Saturday) ==
- In San Juan County, Utah, the Rainbow Bridge was located by the United States government in an expedition guided by Jim Mike (1872–1977), a Paiute Indian, who had disclosed its existence to William B. Douglas of the U.S. Bureau of Land Management. At 275 feet (84 m) in length, the Rainbow is the world's longest natural bridge.
- The first motor race took place at the Indianapolis Motor Speedway, with motorcycles rather than automobiles. Seven races were held in one day, sanctioned by the Federation of American Motorcyclists. A.G. Chapple won the first race, a five-mile (8 km) handicap limited to private owners.

== August 15, 1909 (Sunday) ==
- A 46-foot-tall (14 m) Celtic cross was raised by the Ancient Order of Hibernians in memory of thousands of Irish immigrants who had died on the island after being quarantined there.
- Isidore Bakanja died in Busira, in the Belgian Congo, six months after severe beating, later described as "the remarkable if not unique case of a native-born African killed by a European and declared a martyr" beatified on April 24, 1994.
- Pius X became the first Roman Catholic Pope to ride in an automobile. The motor car had been the gift of American Catholics.
- Died: Euclides da Cunha, 43, Brazilian author known for Os Sertões, was shot and killed in an altercation

== August 16, 1909 (Monday) ==
- The Law of Associations was decreed as part of the Young Turk Revolution within the Ottoman Empire, and it became part of the Constitution five days later. The law provided in part that in order to prevent "the sowing of political division between the various Ottoman communities", "It is forbidden to form political associations based on national or other communal particularity, or whose names contain references thereto". The revival of Ottomanism, with an emphasis on making Turkish the national language and Islam the official religion, was resisted by Christians in the Balkans and by Moslems in the Middle East and North Africa.
- The towns of Alamo, Manchester, and Swords were all incorporated in the U.S. state of Georgia.
- Niels Neergaard resigned as Council President of Denmark and was succeeded by Count Ludvig Holstein-Ledreborg, the Finance Minister, as head of government.
- Baseball player Red Murray of the Giants made a memorable game saving catch at Forbes Field in Pittsburgh, leaping for the ball and reeling it in as lightning lit up the sky.

== August 17, 1909 (Tuesday) ==
- Paleontologist Earl Douglass discovered what he recorded in his diary as "eight of the tail bones of a Brontosaurus in exact position" at the Green River, 20 miles (32 km) east of Vernal, Utah. These were the first of 350 tons of fossils, including full dinosaur skeletons, that would be excavated from what is now the Dinosaur National Monument.
- Madan Lal Dhingra, who had assassinated Sir Curzon Wyllie and Dr. Cowasji Lalkaka, then attempted suicide, was hanged in London. Dhingra has been viewed alternatively as a terrorist and a martyr for Indian independence.
- Born: Óscar Ribas, Angolan author; in Luanda, Portuguese West Africa (d. 2004)

== August 18, 1909 (Wednesday) ==
- Inventors Wilbur Wright and Orville Wright sued Glenn Curtiss and the Herring-Curtiss Company, alleging that Curtiss's aileron system infringed on their patent for warping airplane wings to control the plane. The court ruled in favor of the Wrights in December. At least one historian has observed that "the Wrights did almost as much to set aviation back as they had done to bring it forward".
- Dundee United F.C. played its first game, as Dundee Hibernian. They played the Dundee Wanderers to a 1–1 draw.
- Arlie Latham, 49, became the oldest major league baseball player to steal a base, a record that still stands more than 100 years later. Latham's Giants beat the Phillies 14–1.

== August 19, 1909 (Thursday) ==
- Aviator Glenn H. Curtiss averted what would have been the first mid-air collision, in a competition at Rheims, France. "The feat was accomplished when, for the first time in history, three heavier-than-air craft were manoeuvering at the same time", a report noted. When Curtiss realized that aviator Dumanest was approaching him at the same altitude, Curtiss climbed rapidly and soared over the other plane.
- The first day of automobile racing in the history of the Indianapolis Motor Speedway was marred by a fatal accident. During the running of a 250-mile (400 km) Prest-O-Lite Trophy Race, driver William Bourque and his mechanic, Harry Holcomb, were killed when their car left the track, struck a fence, and turned over.
- Louis Schwitzer won the very first auto race at the Speedway, an "Indianapolis 5", averaging 57.4 mph (92.4 km/h). The first Indy 500 was held two years later.
- Miner David Bourne discovered an outcropping of gold and started a rush of mining claims at the city of Jarbidge, Nevada. At its height, the remote Elko County town had 1,200 residents.
- Born: Jerzy Andrzejewski, Polish author, in Warsaw; (d. 1983)

== August 20, 1909 (Friday) ==
- The earliest known photograph of Pluto was taken, although the astronomers at the Yerkes Observatory did not realize it. Although Pluto was identified as the ninth planet from 1930 until 2006, historians have identified 14 "pre-discoveries". The 1909 Yerkes photos of August 20 and November 11 were identified in 2000.
- Died: Ludwig Gumplowicz, 72, Austrian social theorist

== August 21, 1909 (Saturday) ==
- Three people were killed at the Indianapolis Motor Speedway when a blown tire sent a racecar crashed into a crowd of spectators, bringing the number of fatalities in the inaugural three days of auto racing at the Speedway to seven.
- Sigmund Freud and Carl Jung departed from Bremen to make a trip to the United States, on board the liner George Washington, where they would arrive on August 28.
- With the United Kingdom and Germany spending unprecedented amounts in ship construction, German Chancellor Bethmann-Holweg approached Britain with a proposal for secret negotiations on a naval and political agreement. The talks ended in October.
- The National Public Assembly of the Ottoman Empire amended the national constitution to make the Grand Vizier, ministers and even the Sultan accountable to Parliament.
- Born:
  - Ethel Caterham, English supercentenarian who became the oldest living person in the world on April 30, 2025, upon the death of Brazilian nun Inah Canabarro Lucas; in Shipton Bellinger, Hampshire (alive in 2026)
  - Nikolay Bogolyubov, Soviet Russian theoretical physicist and mathematician known for the Bogoliubov transformation; in Nizhny Novgorod (d. 1992)
  - C. Douglas Dillon, U.S. Secretary of the Treasury from 1961 to 1965; in Geneva, Switzerland (d. 2003)
- Died: George Cabot Lodge, 35, American poet, died of "heart failure due to indigestion" while on vacation

== August 22, 1909 (Sunday) ==
- The first miracle attributed to Joan of Arc took place at Lourdes when Msgr. Leon Cristiani invoked her blessing upon Miss Therese Belin, curing her of tuberculosis. Joan of Arc would be canonized on May 16, 1920.
- Born: Mel Hein, NFL lineman for the New York Giants, 1931-1945, later inducted into the Pro Football Hall of Fame; in Redding, California (d. 1992)

== August 23, 1909 (Monday) ==
- All 29 people on the U.S. steamer Nicholas Castania were killed when the ship's boilers exploded and the wrecked on Cuba's Isle of Pines, between Carpatachibey and Caleta del Inferno. The wreckage was not found until the following month, along with 18 bodies that had washed ashore, with a report that "some of the bodies were found headless, while others were mutilated in other ways", and the missing 11 were believed to have been consumed by sharks.
- Bill Bergen, a catcher for the Brooklyn Dodgers, threw out six batters on the base paths in a game against St. Louis, a record that still stands.
- The city of La Center, Washington, was incorporated.

== August 24, 1909 (Tuesday) ==
- Construction began on the locks of the Panama Canal, with the pouring of concrete at Gatun, using stone from Portobelo and sand from Nombre de Dios. Work began on the locks at Pedro Miguel on September 1 and at Miraflores in July 1910.

== August 25, 1909 (Wednesday) ==
- The United States Army selected the site for the world's first military airfield, signing a lease of a 160-acre (0.65 km^{2}) tract of flat land at College Park, Maryland. Training of the first two Army pilots began there on October 8.
- Born:
  - Ruby Keeler, Canadian singer and film actress; in Dartmouth, Nova Scotia, as Ethel Hilda Keeler (d. 1993)
  - Michael Rennie, English actor known for portraying Klaatu in The Day the Earth Stood Still); as Eric Alexander Rennie in Idle, West Yorkshire (d. 1971)

== August 26, 1909 (Thursday) ==
- The youth hostel movement got its start when a group of hikers, led by teacher Richard Schirrmann, found shelter from a thunderstorm in a school classroom. Reasoning that each village in Germany had a school, Schirrmann proposed that these provide accommodation to students during the holidays. The first hostel would open in 1912 at Altena.
- Sailing in the Gulf of Mexico, the S.S. Cartago telegraphed a wireless report of a hurricane near the Yucatán Peninsula, marking the first radio warning of a tropical storm.
- Swiss paleontologist Otto Hauser discovered a complete skeleton of a prehistoric man at Combe-Capelle in France, along with stone tools. Originally dated at 35,000 years of age, the Combe-Capelle skull was believed to have been the earliest homo sapiens in Europe, but forensic testing in 2011 revealed that the skeleton dates to about 7575 BC.
- The town of Ridgefield, Washington, was incorporated.
- Born: Jim Davis, American TV actor known for portraying Jock Ewing on Dallas); as Marlin Davis in Edgerton, Missouri (d. 1981)

== August 27, 1909 (Friday) ==
- Officers in Athens led a coup in Greece; Dimitrios Railes was forced to step down as Prime Minister, and Kyriakoules Mavromichales implemented reforms to avert a dictatorship.
- Henry Farman became the first person to fly an airplane 100 miles (160 km), winning the Grand Prix de la Champagne endurance test and reaching 180 kilometers (110 mi) in 3:04:56.4 at Rheims.
- Born: Lester Young, American saxophone player; in Woodville, Mississippi (d. 1959)
- Died: Emil Christian Hansen, 67, Danish fermentation physiologist

== August 28, 1909 (Saturday) ==
- A flash flood in Monterrey in Mexico, drowned 1,200 people and left 15,000 homeless. The crest of the rain-swollen Santa Catarina river reached the city shortly after midnight.
- (August 15 O.S.) The Goudi coup in Greece against the government of Dimitrios Rallis began in the Athens neighbourhood of Goudi.
- The California cities of San Pedro and Wilmington were consolidated with Los Angeles.

== August 29, 1909 (Sunday) ==
- Glenn Curtiss won the world's first airplane race, conducted at Rheims, France, and a $5,000 prize. While other pilots slowed down to make turns on a two-lap course, Curtiss showed that sharp turns could be banked.

== August 30, 1909 (Monday) ==
- A gusher at the Maikop oil field in Russia rose to a height of 65 metres (213 ft), but most of the well's contents were lost because the operators were not prepared to store it.
- The International League Against Epilepsy was founded, in Budapest, Hungary, during the 16th International Medical Conference.
- The German battleship Helgoland was launched at Kiel, the first of a new class of ships with larger guns and improved propulsion.
- In Fez, Morocco, the consuls of France, Great Britain and Spain presented a letter of protest to the Sultan, demanding the abolition of the practice of mutilation and slow death as punishment. The initiative took place twenty days after more than 30 convicted criminals had hands or feet amputated.
- The city of Tokyo announced a gift of cherry trees to be planted at the Tidal Basin in Washington, D.C. The gift was paid for, anonymously, by Jokichi Takamini, the millionaire chemist who invented synthetic epinephrine.

== August 31, 1909 (Tuesday) ==
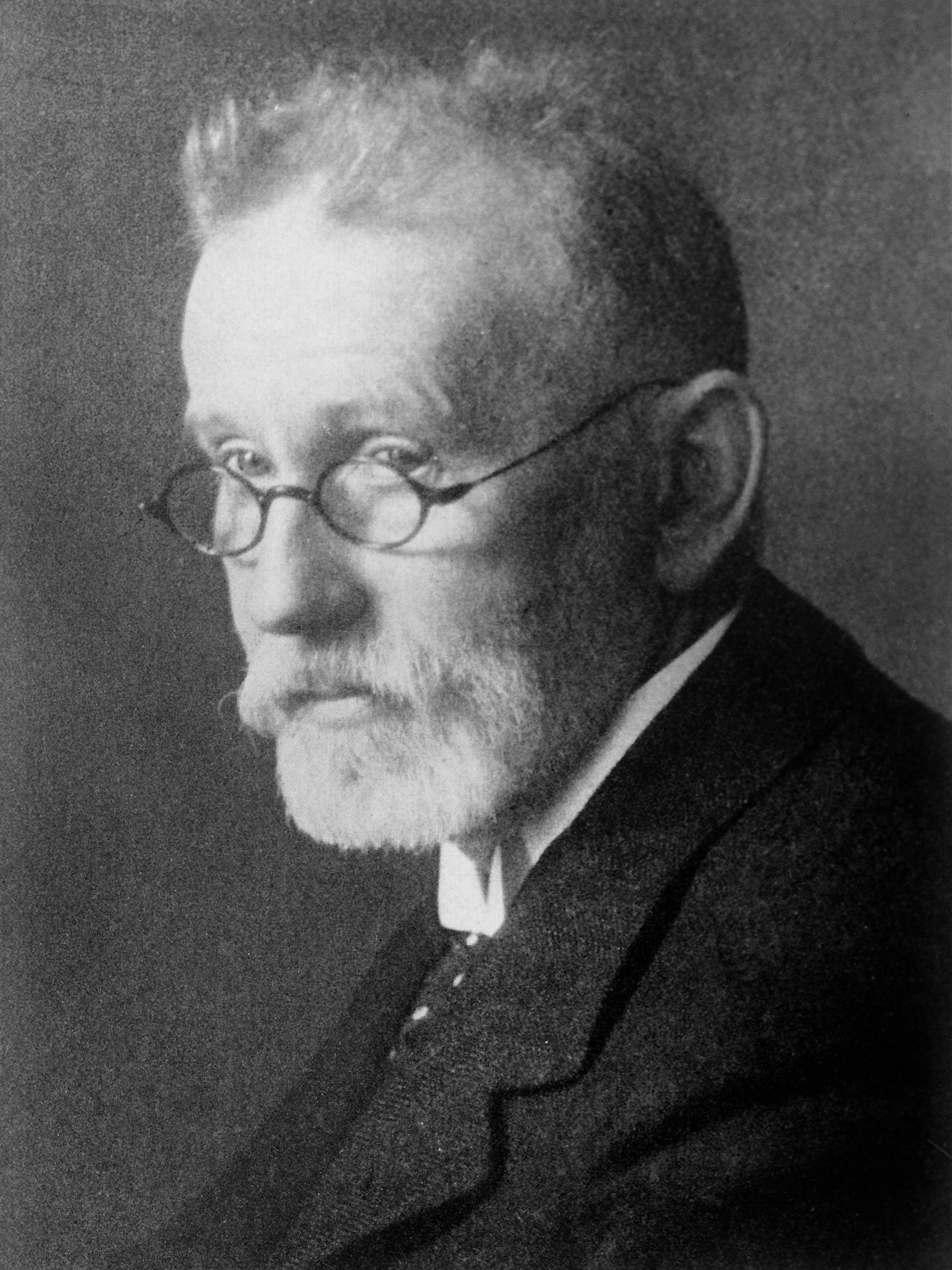
Dr. Ehrlich

- Paul Ehrlich found the first successful treatment for syphilis, arsphenamine, on his 606th experiment. The compound, based on arsenic, was the "magic bullet" that assisted the human immune system in combatting an illness, and led to the first use of chemotherapy. The number 606 would become the slang name for the treatment with Salvarsan, the trade name for arsphenamine.
- Abbot Augustus Low was granted U.S. patent No. 929,960 for the paper shredder, which was described as an improved "waste-paper receptacle". Low wrote in his application that his invention was designed for "not only the collection and storage of waste paper ... but also its cancellation or mutilation in such manner as to render it unavailable or unintelligible for re-use or for information" – the first paper shredder. Adolf Ehinger of Germany marketed the first shredder in 1955.
- Charles D. Walcott discovered the Burgess Shale fossils, one of the greatest finds in the history of paleontology, unearthing fossils 530 million years old.
- Born: Ferenc Fejtő, Hungarian-born French journalist and political scientist; in Nagykanizsa, Austro-Hungarian Empire (d. 2008)
