= October 1909 =

Month in 1909

<<	October 1909					>>
Su	Mo	Tu	We	Th	Fr	Sa
					1	2
3	4	5	6	7	8	9
10	11	12	13	14	15	16
17	18	19	20	21	22	23
24	25	26	27	28	29	30
31

The following events occurred in October 1909:

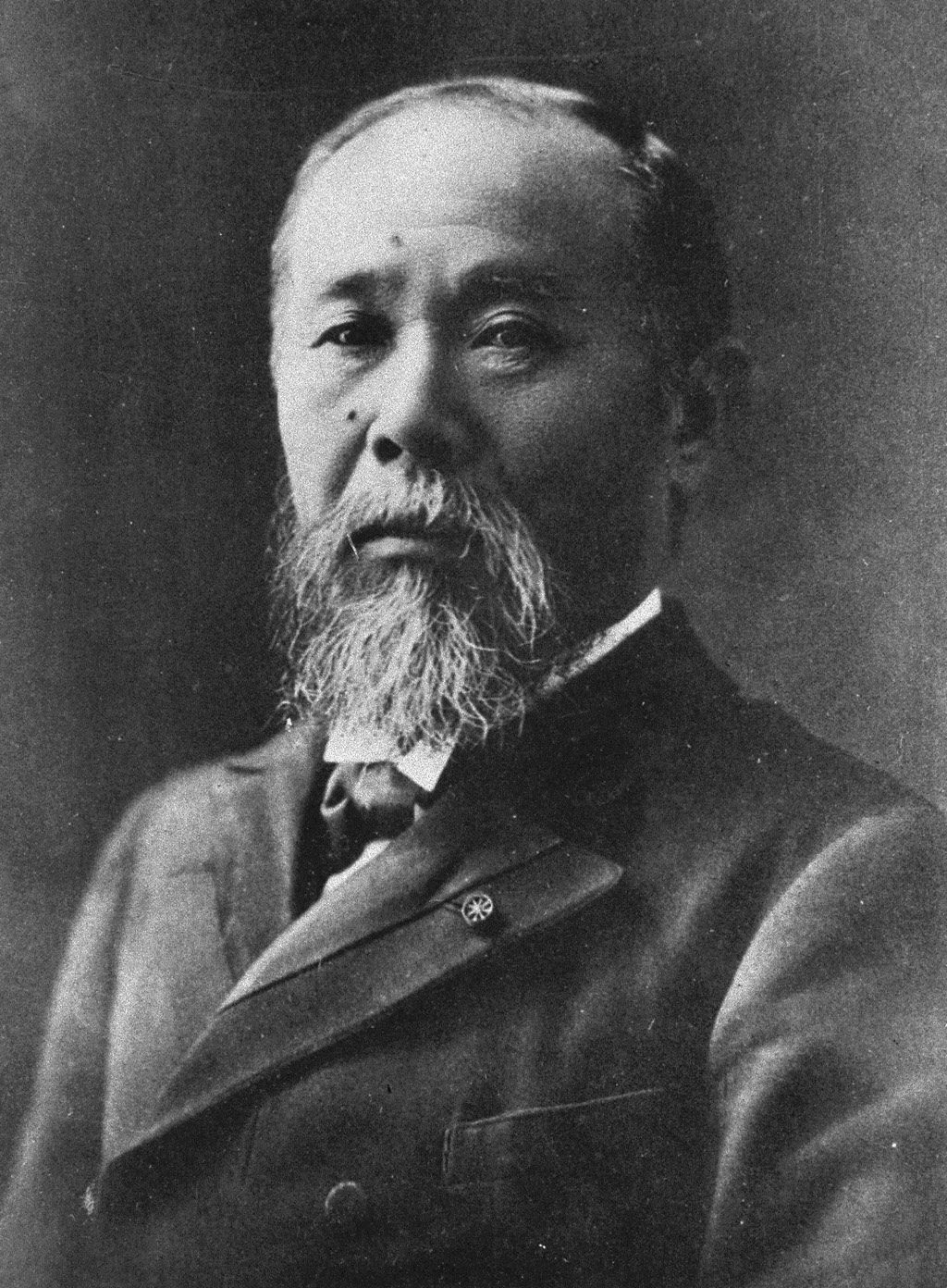
October 26, 1909: Ito Hirobumi, Japanese Governor-General of Korea, assassinated

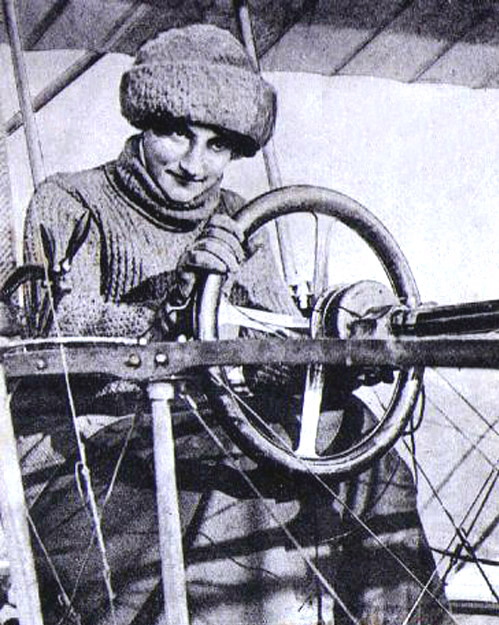
October 22, 1909: The Baroness de Laroche becomes first woman to fly an airplane solo

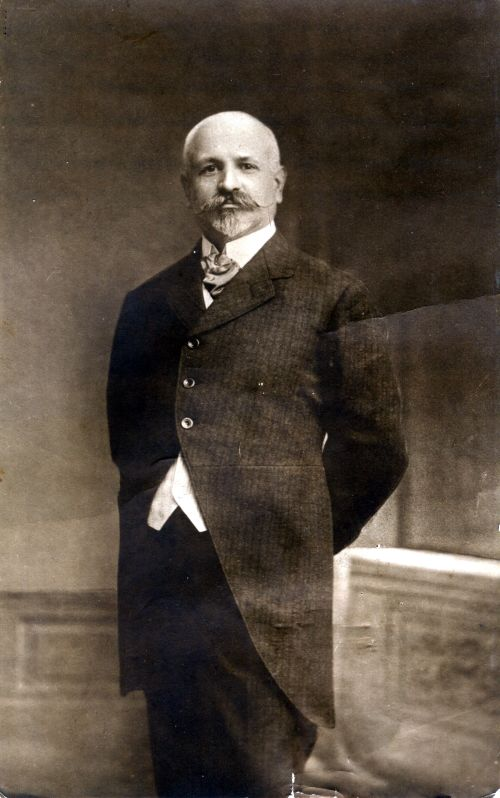
October 13, 1909: Francisco Ferrer executed

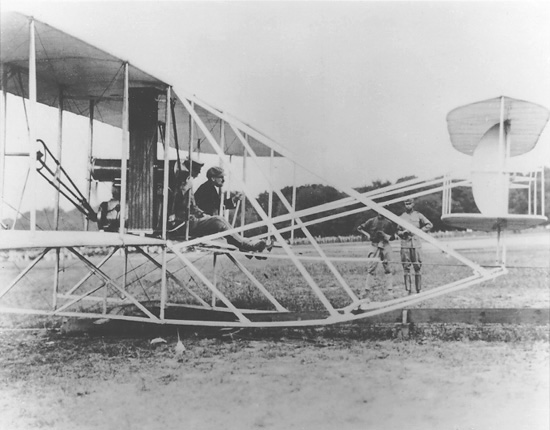
October 8, 1909: Lt. Frank Lahm instructed on flying an airplane

== October 1, 1909 (Friday) ==
- Bhupinder Singh, the Maharaja of the Sikh princely state of Patiala, assumed full power upon attaining his 18th birthday. A Council of Regency had ruled in his name when he had assumed the throne at the age of 9. Bhupinder Singh ruled until his death in 1938.

== October 2, 1909 (Saturday) ==
- In Berlin, Orville Wright became the first person to fly an airplane to an altitude of 1,000 feet (300 m), and eventually reached 1,600 feet (490 m). The same day, Crown Prince Wilhelm of Germany became the first member of royalty to fly in an airplane, as Orville's passenger on a ten-minute flight.
- Twickenham Stadium, Britain's second largest stadium and the London home of the Rugby Football Union, hosted its first rugby match. Harlequin F.C. defeated Richmond F.C. 14–10.
- Born: Alex Raymond, creator of Flash Gordon; in New Rochelle, New York (d. 1956 following automobile accident)

== October 3, 1909 (Sunday) ==
- James Reid Moore of Ipswich, East Anglia, discovered what he believed to be flint tools dating from the Pliocene era, and evidence of the first human habitation of Britain. The flint objects, dubbed eoliths, were later determined to have been natural phenomena created by erosion of flint.
- The cornerstone for the Saskatchewan Legislative Building was laid by the Earl Grey, Governor General of Canada, who placed a time capsule inside.

== October 4, 1909 (Monday) ==
- As Dr. Frederick Cook's claim of being first to reach the North Pole, was being questioned, his claim to have made the first ascent of Denali was called into doubt. Cook had stated in his book, To the Top of the Continent, that he had reached the summit of the Alaskan mountain on September 16, 1906. His mountain guide, Edward N. Barrill, swore out an affidavit that he and Cook had never been closer than 14 miles (23 km) to Denali, and that Cook had ordered him to alter his diary entries. The October 4 affidavit was published ten days later in a New York newspaper, the Globe and Commercial Advertiser.
- Born: Murray Chotiner, American political advisor to Richard Nixon; in Pittsburgh (d. 1974)
- The Austrian composer Arnold Schoenberg finished his groundbreaking opera, the atonal monodrama Erwartung. However, the opera did not premiere until June 6, 1924.

== October 5, 1909 (Tuesday) ==
- Henry Ford and William C. Durant reached an agreement whereby Ford Motor Company would be acquired by General Motors for eight million dollars. Durant was unable to obtain the financing to make the agreed upon down payment of $2,000,000.
- The first classes were conducted at East Carolina University, as 104 women and 19 men began their studies at the East Carolina Teachers Training School in Greenville, North Carolina.
- Born: Tony Malinosky, oldest living MLB player after the death of Bill Werber in 2009; in Collinsville, Illinois (d. 2011) (Connie Marrero, born April 25, 1911, would be considered the oldest until his death on April 23, 2014)

== October 6, 1909 (Wednesday) ==
- An explosion at the Wellington Colliery at Nanaimo, British Columbia, killed 32 coal miners. Twenty-two years earlier, 150 miners had died at the company's mines.
- Martha Rendell was executed at Fremantle Prison in Perth, Western Australia for the murder of three children.
- Born: Robert Potter, English architect noted for his work on church buildings.

== October 7, 1909 (Thursday) ==
- William H. Taft became the last American president to ride in a stagecoach (as opposed to an open horse-drawn carriage). President Taft and naturalist John Muir rode for ten hours on a 34 miles (55 km) trip through the Yosemite National Park from El Portal to Wawona, California.
- Born: Herblock, (Herbert Lawrence Block) American editorial cartoonist; in Chicago; (d. 2001)

== October 8, 1909 (Friday) ==
- Seismologist Andrija Mohorovičić of Zagreb obtained laboratory data from an earthquake that struck to the southeast of the Croatian city. By analyzing the behavior of the seismic waves from different locations, Mohorovičić established the existence of a layer between the Earth's crust and its Mantle (geology). The layer, more than 20 miles (30 km) underground, is now referred to as Mohorovičić discontinuity or the "Moho".
- Lt. Frank Lahm became the first person to receive flight instruction from the U.S. Army, as Wilbur Wright showed him how to pilot the Wright Flyer at College Park, Maryland. 2nd Lt. Frederic E. Humphreys began instruction later that day.

== October 9, 1909 (Saturday) ==
- William James Sidis of Brookline, Massachusetts, became the youngest student ever admitted into Harvard University. The 11-year-old son of two Russian physicians began studies in mathematics.
- In college football, Kentucky defeated Illinois, 6–2. At a chapel service following the game, ROTC Commandant Philip Carbusier noted that the team "fought like wildcats", inspiring the team's nickname.

== October 10, 1909 (Sunday) ==
- Backed by American businessmen, General Juan José Estrada began a revolution in Nicaragua to overthrow President José Santos Zelaya. Under pressure from the United States, Zelaya resigned in December, and Estrada became president in August with American support. An observer later noted, "The overthrow of President Zelaya in Nicaragua was the first real American coup."

== October 11, 1909 (Monday) ==
- The Convention Internationale Relative à la Circulation des Automobiles was signed in Paris by 17 European nations, establishing common rules for rules of the road in the signatory nations. The treaty included the first four universal traffic signs (intersection, railroad crossing, curve and ditch), rules on passing and overtaking, and letter symbols for a car's nation of origin (A-Austria, B-Belgium, CH-Switzerland, D-Germany, E-Spain, F-France, GB-Great Britain, GR-Greece, H-Hungary, I-Italy, MC-Monaco, MN-Montenegro, NL-Netherlands, P-Portugal, R-Russia, RM-Romania, S-Sweden, SB-Serbia).

== October 12, 1909 (Tuesday) ==
- The Amish bishops of Lancaster County, Pennsylvania, denied a request by 35 families—one-fifth of the community—to ease a ban on use of electricity and telephones. The "Schism of 1910" followed in February and the group, dubbed the "Peachey Church" separated from the Old Order Amish church.
- The association football team Coritiba was founded in Curitiba, Brazil.

== October 13, 1909 (Wednesday) ==
- Professor Francisco Ferrer was executed by a firing squad in Barcelona after a military court convicted him of inciting the Catalan uprising against the Kingdom of Spain. Outrage over Ferrer's execution led to riots outside Spain's embassies in Paris and other European capitals.
- The Ontario Provincial Police was created in Toronto.
- Born: Art Tatum, American jazz pianist; in Toledo, Ohio; (d.1956)

== October 14, 1909 (Thursday) ==
- The first Provincial Assemblies were opened in China, followed a year later by a National Assembly.
- In Game 6 of the 1909 World Series, the Detroit Tigers tied the best-of-7 series by beating the Pittsburgh Pirates 5–4.
- The Federación Española de Clubes de Fútbol (FECF), the first national Spanish football federation, was founded in Spain on October 14, 1909. In 1913, the circuit was superseded by the Real Federación Española de Fútbol (RFEF).
- Born: Bernd Rosemeyer, German race car driver; in Lingen (killed in auto accident, 1938).

== October 15, 1909 (Friday) ==
- The Dover Harbour was opened as a suitable port for the British Navy after eleven years and $20,000,000 worth of improvements. The Prince of Wales dedicated the harbor, which could now accommodate the largest British dreadnoughts.
- Born: Margie Hines, American voice actress, in Glendale, Queens, New York (d. 1985)

== October 16, 1909 (Saturday) ==
- The world's first passenger airline, DELAG (DEutsche Luftschiffahrt AktienGesellschaft), was founded in Frankfurt, Germany.
- The Pittsburgh Pirates beat the Detroit Tigers 8–0 to win Game 7 of the 1909 World Series and baseball's world championship.
- The Board of Directors of General Motors approved a plan to buy the Ford Motor Company for eight million dollars. The deal fell through when GM could not obtain financing.
- William H. Taft, the President of the United States, met Porfirio Díaz, the President of Mexico, at the Chamber of Commerce in El Paso, Texas. That evening, Taft became the first American President to visit a foreign nation when he crossed over to Ciudad Juárez for a banquet hosted by Diaz. "An interesting incident of the day was the declaration of neutrality over the El Chamizal territory", wrote The New York Times. Both nations agreed that the area, which had been south of the Rio Grande until a rerouting of that river, should be considered neutral territory.
- In Seattle, the Alaska-Yukon-Pacific Exposition world's fair closed after 4 1/2 months.
- Stanley Ketchel fought heavyweight boxing champion Jack Johnson in a match at Colma, California. In the 12th round, Ketchel knocked the champ down with his first punch. Enraged, Johnson struck back with a right uppercut that broke Ketchel's front teeth and knocked out the challenger.

== October 17, 1909 (Sunday) ==
- Lt. George Sweet became the first U.S. Navy officer to fly in an aircraft, as a passenger of Orville Wright.
- Died: Sagen Ishizuka, Japanese physician and nutritionist, proponent of macrobiotic diet.

== October 18, 1909 (Monday) ==
- The Australian State of New South Wales formally surrendered 900 square miles (2,300 km^{2}) of its land to the Commonwealth to serve as the Australian Capital Territory, with Canberra to serve as the federal capital. The agreement included a right of way across the state to Jervis Bay, which was ceded to the Commonwealth in 1913.
- A woman watching an airshow at Port-Aviation (often called "Juvisy Airfield") in Viry-Châtillon, France, became the first person on the ground to be killed by a falling airplane. A Blériot machine, flown by Alfred Leblanc, plunged into a crowd, injuring more than a dozen people, and killing the woman.
- Charles de Lambert became the first person to fly an airplane over Paris and around the Eiffel Tower.

== October 19, 1909 (Tuesday) ==
- Nannie Helen Burroughs founded the National Training School for Women and Girls in Washington, D.C., one of the first institutions of higher learning for African-American women.
- William Friese-Greene was granted U.S. patent No. 937,367 for a process he called "Biocolour", which alternated between blue, green and red frames of film to create an illusion of color and a stereoscopic 3D image.
- Simon Ter-Petrossian, better known as "Kamo" was returned to Tbilisi on extradition from Germany, to face execution for a 1907 bank robbery that raised funds for the Bolsheviks. Kamo survived to become part of the Soviet government until being murdered in 1922.
- Born: Cozy Cole, American jazz drummer; in East Orange, New Jersey; (d. 1981)
- Died: Cesare Lombroso, 74, Italian criminologist

== October 20, 1909 (Wednesday) ==
- The entire town of Shipton, Kansas, was sold at public auction. William Irwin had owned the site and Fred Warnow was the high bidder at $2,620. Located in Saline County, Kansas, Shipton had been a farming community until 1895, when the post office and the railroad station were closed, and the citizens moved closer to nearby Salina.

== October 21, 1909 (Thursday) ==
- The Madras Aquarium, the first aquarium in India, was opened as part of the government museum in Madras (now Chennai). The aquarium was emptied of its contents in 1942, when the city was evacuated due to a threatened invasion by Japan.

== October 22, 1909 (Friday) ==
- The British Indian government legally recognized the Anand Karaj, the Sikh marriage ceremony, with the passage of the Anand Marriage Act 1909.
- The Baronne de Laroche became the first woman to pilot an airplane alone. The Baronne took off from an airfield at Chalon-sur-Saône and flew to an altitude of 300 metres (980 ft), flew for 4 miles (6 km), then landed.
- The town of Gore, Oklahoma, was incorporated.
- Died: Thomas Coman, New York City official who made millions from graft and eluded conviction; Acting Mayor, 1868.

== October 23, 1909 (Saturday) ==
- An Arbitral Tribunal, of the International Court of Justice at The Hague, issued its ruling in the Grisbadarna case, delimiting the maritime frontier between Norway and Sweden, and setting out a legal principle still followed in international law: "a state of things which actually exists and has existed for a long time should be changed as little as possible".

== October 24, 1909 (Sunday) ==
- At the Italian city of Racconigi, Tsar Nicholas II of Russia was hosted by King Victor Emmanuel III. The foreign ministers the two nations, Tomasso Tittoni and Aleksandr Izvolsky, exchanged diplomatic notes on an informal agreement for Russia and Italy to support each other's interests in the Balkans and in the Ottoman Empire.
- The sorority Alpha Epsilon Phi was founded by seven Jewish students, with its first chapter at Barnard College.
- Born: Bill Carr, American track star, Olympic gold medalist 1932; in Pine Bluff, Arkansas; (d. 1966)
- Died: Rufus Peckham, 70, U.S. Supreme Court Justice 1896–1909

== October 25, 1909 (Monday) ==
- In the city of Empúries in Spain, a bust of Asklepios, the Greek god of medicine, was discovered. Empuries, also called Ampurias, was on the site of the Greek settlement of Emporion.
- Fort Meade, Florida, was incorporated for the second time as a city, after having been disincorporated in 1903.

== October 26, 1909 (Tuesday) ==
- Itō Hirobumi, who had served as Prime Minister of Japan and later as Japan's Governor-General in the protectorate of Korea, was assassinated while waiting to change trains at a station in Harbin, China. Dressed in Western clothing, An Chung-gun walked past the Russian security officers assigned to guard Hirobumi, then fired three shots at the Japanese statesman. Struck in the liver, Hirobumi died fifteen minutes later. An, a Korean nationalist, was executed on March 25, 1910, and Japan annexed Korea later that year.
- U.S. Army Lieutenant Frederick E. Humphreys became the first military pilot to fly an airplane solo, after three weeks of instruction by Wilbur Wright.
- The Rockefeller Sanitary Commission for the Eradication of Hookworm Disease, more popularly known as the "Hookworm Commission" was created, with Dr. Charles Wardell Stiles as its chairman. Over a five-year period, the Commission reduced the number of cases of the disease in the United States. In 1915, the International Health Commission extended the campaign throughout the world.
- The sinking of the British steamer Hestia killed 35 of the 41 people aboard after the ship struck a reef off of the island of Grand Manan in the Canadian province of New Brunswick.

== October 27, 1909 (Wednesday) ==
- Sir Oliver Lodge published an article in the Journal of the British Astronomical Association theorizing that if there had been intelligent life on Mars, it had been destroyed by a catastrophe two months earlier. Lodge based his theory on observations that suggested that the polar caps of Mars had fractured in August.
- Sarah Van Deman flew as a passenger on an airplane at the Signal Corps grounds at College Park, Maryland, becoming the first woman to fly in a plane in America. She was the fifth woman to fly, the first four having flown in Europe.
- Born: Henry Townsend, American blues musician; in Shelby, Mississippi; (d. 2006)

== October 28, 1909 (Thursday) ==
- Menelik II, the Emperor of Ethiopia, suffered a massive stroke from which he never fully recovered. Over the next few months, Menelik's wife, the Empress Taytu Betul, set about replacing government officials until army officers stopped her in March.
- The city of Eatonville, Washington, was incorporated.
- Born: Francis Bacon, Irish painter; in Dublin; (d. 1992)

== October 29, 1909 (Friday) ==
- The Dani people of the mountains of Papua New Guinea had their first encounter with European people, and vice versa, as an expedition led by Hendrikus Albertus Lorentz reached people who referred to themselves as the Pesegem and the Horip tribes.
- The first Boy Scout troop in the United States was organized, created in Barre, Vermont.

== October 30, 1909 (Saturday) ==
- Eugene Byrne, a left tackle for the Army Cadets football team, was fatally injured in a game against the visiting Harvard Crimson. Two weeks earlier, Edwin Wilson, the quarterback for the Navy Midshipmen, was rendered comatose in a game against Villanova. Army cancelled the remainder of its schedule, including the annual Army–Navy Game.
- Arkansas defeated LSU 16–0 in a football game, and coach Hugo Bezdek remarked that the players were like "a wild band of Razorback hogs". The school's teams, formerly known as the Cardinals, were thereafter known as the Razorbacks.
- Count Louis von Vetsera, who had been a suspect in the 1889 deaths of Austria-Hungary's Crown Prince Rudolf and Baroness Mary Vetsera at Mayerling, died in Denver.
- Born: Homi J. Bhabha, nuclear physicist and father of India's nuclear program; in Bombay (Mumbai) (d. 1966)

== October 31, 1909 (Sunday) ==
- The Royal University of Ireland, founded in 1880, was dissolved by terms of the Irish Universities Act 1908, and replaced by the National University of Ireland and the Queen's University of Belfast.
- French architectural engineer Albert Gisclard, who designed a cable-stayed bridge for the Pyrenees mountain railway, was killed during a test of the railroad. The train, which was not equipped with an adequate brake system, derailed and plunged 1,000 feet (300 m) into a valley.
- Born: Frank Bateson, New Zealand astronomer and specialist on variable stars; in Wellington (d. 2007)
