= Leo Muthu =

Indian philanthropist (1952–2015)

- லியோ முத்து

Founder-Chairman of Sairam Institutions
- In office 1989 - 10 July 2015
- Succeeded by: Dr Sai Prakash Leo Muthu

Managing Partner of Leo Group of Companies
- In office 1973 - 10 July 2015
- Succeeded by: Kalaiselvi Jothiprakasam

Personal details
- Born: M. Jothiprakasam (K. G. M. Jothiprakasam); 2 April 1952 Thiruthuraipoondi, Thanjavur Dist, Madras State, India (now Tamil Nadu, India)
- Died: 10 July 2015 (aged 63) Chennai, Tamil Nadu, India
- Spouse: Tmt. Kalaiselvi Jothiprakasam (m. 1978)
- Relations: T. R. Baalu (in-laws); T. R. B. Rajaa (son-in-law)
- Children: Tmt. Sharmila J Rajaa (b.1980); Dr. Sai Prakash Leo Muthu (b.1983)
- Occupation: Philanthropist, Businessman, Educationist

M. Jothiprakasam (2 April 1952 – 10 July 2015), better known as Leo Muthu, was an Indian philanthropist, educationist and businessman. He was the Founder-Chairman of the "Sairam Institutions", which operates many secondary and ter educational institutions. His official name is MJF.Ln.Leo Muthu.

== Early life ==
Leo Muthu was born in 1952 in Thiruthuraipoondi Village, Thiruvarur District, Tamil Nadu to KG Manickam-Nagalakshmi. He started his career in real estate in 1972.

== Promotion of education ==
Leo Muthu founded educational trusts that serve the cause of providing quality education to the learner community. The group of colleges under the trusts offers education across technical, management studies, research, shipping science, alternative medicine streams and more. About 25,000 students are being given the benefit of education per year through the group's schools and colleges.

- Sapthagiri Educational Trust runs the following institutions in Tamil Nadu and Puducherry:
  - Sri Sai Ram Engineering College, Chennai
  - Sri Sairam Institute of Management Studies, Chennai
  - Sri Sairam Institute of Computer Applications, Chennai
  - Sri Sairam Institute of Technology, Chennai
  - Sri Sairam Siddha Medical College and Research Centre, Chennai
  - Sri Sairam Ayurveda Medical College and Research Centre, Chennai
  - Sri Sairam Homoeopathy Medical College and Research Centre, Chennai
  - Sai Ram Advanced Centre for Research, Chennai.
  - Sai Ram Matriculation Hr.School, Goripalayam, Madurai
  - Sai Ram Polytechnic College, Eliyarpathy, Madurai
  - Sri Sairam College of Education, Puducherry
  - Sai Ram Matriculation school, Thiruvarur
  - Sai Ram Vidyalaya, Madipakkam, Chennai.
  - Sai Ram Vidyalaya, Puducherry
- Institutions run by Leo Muthu Educational Trust include:
  - Sri Sai Ram Polytechnic College, Sai Leo Nagar, West Tambaram, Chennai
  - Sai Matriculation Higher Secondary School, Madipakkam, Chennai
  - Sai Ram Matriculation Hr.School, Sai Leo Nagar, West Tambaram, Chennai
  - Sai Ram Matriculation Hr. School, Thiruthuraipoondi
  - Sairam Leo Muthu Public School, Medavakkam, Chennai
- The institutions run under Sapthagiri Educational and Charitable Trust are the following:
  - Sri Sairam College of Engineering, formerly Shirdi Sai Engineering College, Anekal, Bangalore.
  - Shirdi Sai Pre University college, Anekal, Bangalore.

== Business ==
Leo Muthu was the Managing Partner of Leo Real Estates and Managing Director of Leo Housing (P) Ltd., in Chennai. In his housing business, he introduced 75+ housing schemes and industrial complexes in and around the suburbs of Chennai, Madurai, Hosur and Bangalore. For his innovative real estate and construction ventures, Leo Muthu was awarded the “Best Real Estate Promoter Award” by the former Governor of Tamil Nadu, Shri B. N. Singh.

Leo Muthu was also the Managing Director of Super Fibre Glass (P) Ltd., a SSI manufacturing unit of Fibre Glass Sleeves and Chords, at Chennai which is a supplier to Lucas TVS, English Electric Co., and Kirloskar Co., among others. He also ran Sri Sai Raj Printers, a printing company, Super Sea Food Products Pvt. Ltd, Tuticorin, a fish products company, and Sai Jothi Quarry, Chennai, which is engaged in quarrying stones.
