= Pudukkottai Lok Sabha constituency =

Former constituency of the Indian parliament in Tamil Nadu

Coordinates: 10.38°N 78.82°E

Pudukkottai
- Former Lok Sabha constituency

Constituency details
- Country: India
- Region: South India
- State: Tamil Nadu
- Established: 1952
- Abolished: 2008
- Reservation: None

Pudukkottai was a Lok Sabha constituency in Tamil Nadu. After delimitation in 2009, it is now a defunct constituency.

== Assembly segments ==
Pudukkottai Lok Sabha constituency was composed of the following assembly segments:

1. Pattukkottai (moved to Thanjavur constituency after 2009)
2. Peravurani (moved to Thanjavur constituency after 2009)
3. Kolathur (SC) (dissolved and its territories were shared between the newly formed Gandarvakottai and Viralimalai constituencies after 2009)
4. Pudukkottai (moved to Tiruchirappall constituency after 2009)
5. Alangudi (moved to Sivaganga constituency after 2009)
6. Arantangi (moved to Ramanathapuram constituency after 2009)

== Members of Parliament ==
Year	Name	Party
1951	K.M. Valatharsu	Kisan Mazdoor Praja Party
1957	R. Ramanathan Chettiar	Indian National Congress
1962	R. Umanath	Communist Party of India
1967	R. Umanath	Communist Party of India (Marxist)
1971	K. Veeriah	Dravida Munnetra Kazhagam
1977	V.S. Elanchezhian	All India Anna Dravida Munnetra Kazhagam
1980	V.N. Swamynathan	Indian National Congress (I)
1984	N. Sundararaj	Indian National Congress
1989	N. Sundararaj	Indian National Congress
1991	N. Sundararaj	Indian National Congress
1996	Tiruchi Siva	Dravida Munnetra Kazhagam
1998	Raja Paramasivam	All India Anna Dravida Munnetra Kazhagam
1999	S. Thirunavukkarasu	MGR Anna Dravida Munnetra Kazhagam
2002 (changed his party)	S. Thirunavukkarasu	Bharatiya Janata Party
2004	S. Regupathy	Dravida Munnetra Kazhagam

== Election results ==
Vote share of Winning candidates
2004	56.82%
1999	50.7%
1998	36.4%
1996	48.1%
1991	61.6%
1989	65.8%
1984	65.3%
1980	49.1%
1977	64.2%
1971	53.9%
1967	46.6%
1962	43.4%
1957	50.1%
1952	53.4%

=== 2004 ===
2004 Indian general elections: Pudukkottai
Party	Candidate	Votes	%	±%
DMK	S. Regupathy	466,133	56.82	n/a
AIADMK	Ravichandran. A	309,637	37.75	n/a
BSP	Nagooran. A	10,024	1.22	n/a
Independent	M. S. Lion Rajendran	9,723	1.19	n/a
Majority		156,496	19.08	+10.84
Turnout		820,300	66.42	+2.32
DMK gain from MADMK		Swing	+56.82	

=== General Election 1999 ===
Party	Candidate	Votes	%
MADMK	S.Thirunavukkarasar	396,216	50.7%
INC	S.Singaaravadivel	331,914	42.5%
PT	M.Palaniappan	29,453	3.8%
IND	M.Ramaiah	7,710	1.0%
Majority		64,302	8.2%
Turnout		780,964	64.1%
MADMK gain from AIADMK			

=== General Election 1998 ===
Party	Candidate	Votes	%
AIADMK	Paramasivam Raja	288,072	36.4%
DMK	P.N.Siva	257,552	32.5%
MADMK	S.Thirunavukkarasar	226,416	28.6%
IND	M.R.Chokkalingam	895	0.1%
IND	C.Velappan	448	0.1%
Majority		30,520	3.9%
Turnout		791,405	66.8%
AIADMK gain from DMK			

=== General Election 1996 ===
Party	Candidate	Votes	%
DMK	N.Siva	398,209	48.1%
INC	V.N.Swaminathan	220,336	26.6%
AIIC(T)	T.Pushparaj	61,830	7.5%
MDMK	R.Karthikeyan	60,405	7.3%
BJP	K.Shanmughanathan	16,147	1.9%
IND	I.Jahuber	8,320	1.0%
IND	C.Nagarajan	2,930	0.4%
Majority		177,873	21.5%
Turnout		828,411	73.7%
DMK gain from INC			

=== General Election 1991 ===
Party	Candidate	Votes	%
INC	N.Sundararajan	460,795	61.6%
DMK	K.Chandrasekhar	241,074	32.2%
IND	L.S.Kamal Baatsha	9,036	1.2%
IND	R.Thirumaravan	3,885	0.5%
PMK	V.Thiruvarangam	3,638	0.5%
Majority		219,721	29.4%
Turnout		748,163	71.4%
INC Hold			

=== General Election 1989 ===
Party	Candidate	Votes	%
INC	N.Sundararajan	518,762	65.8%
DMK	A.Selvaraj	247,626	31.4%
IND	M.R.Chokkalingam	3,191	0.4%
IND	P.A.Palani	2,503	0.3%
Tharasu Makkal Mandram	A.Mohanraj	1,793	0.2%
PMK	Sivaperumal	1,002	0.1%
Majority		271,136	34.4%
Turnout		787,854	74.7%
INC Hold			

=== General Election 1984 ===
Party	Candidate	Votes	%
INC	N.Sundararajan	426,717	65.3%
DMK	K.Veeraih	161,813	24.7%
INC(J)	Singaravel Chettiyar	16,902	2.6%
Majority		264,904	40.5%
Turnout		653,865	81.1%
INC Hold			

=== General Election 1980 ===
Party	Candidate	Votes	%
INC	V.N.Swaminathan	294,494	49.1%
AIADMK	Kuzha Chezhiyan	278,395	46.4%
IND	S.Sooriyanarayanan	6,486	1.1%
IND	M.Dhandayudhapani	6,389	1.1%
JP(S)	K.Ramanujan	4,150	0.7%
Majority		16,099	2.7%
Turnout		600,327	80.7%
INC gain from AIADMK			

=== General Election 1977 ===
Party	Candidate	Votes	%
AIADMK	V.S.Elanchezhiyan	342,120	64.2%
INC(O)	V.Vairava Thevar	118,505	22.2%
IND	Kuzha Chellaih	49,147	9.2%
IND	Singaravel Chettiyar	10,790	2.0%
Majority		223,615	42.0%
Turnout		532,811	76.1%
AIADMK gain from DMK			

=== General Election 1971 ===
Party	Candidate	Votes	%
DMK	K.Veeraiah	251,861	53.9%
INC(O)	R.Vijaya Reghunatha Thondaiman	203,466	43.5%
Majority		48,395	10.4%
Turnout		455,327	75.3%
DMK gain from CPI(M)			

=== General Election 1967 ===
Party	Candidate	Votes	%
CPI(M)	R.Umanath	199,469	46.6%
INC	A.N.Chettiyar	190,087	44.4%
IND	S.R.G.Iyer	23,828	5.6%
Majority		9,382	2.2%
Turnout		413,384	76.9%
CPI(M) Hold			

=== General Election 1962 ===
Party	Candidate	Votes	%
CPI(M)	R.Umanath	134,162	43.4%
INC	L.Alagusundaram Chettiyar	103,944	33.6%
SWA	A.R.Nagappa Chettiyar	60,073	19.4%
Majority		30,218	9.8%
Turnout		298,179	66.8%
CPI(M) gain from INC			

=== General Election 1957 ===
Party	Candidate	Votes	%
INC	F.Ramanathan Chettiyar	111,694	50.1%
PSP	K.M.Vallatharas	46,242	20.8%
CPI	V.Nagu servai	45,383	20.4%
IND	S.Soundararajan	19,432	8.7%
Majority		65,452	
Turnout		222,751	53.1%
INC gain from KMPP			

=== General Election 1952 ===
Party	Candidate	Votes	%
KMPP	K.M.Vallatharasu	102,404	53.4%
INC	V.Ramaiah Servai	89,293	46.6%
Majority		13,111	
Turnout		191,697	51.2%
KMPP Win (New Seat)			

== See also ==
- Pudukottai
- List of constituencies of the Lok Sabha
