= First Manmohan Singh ministry =

Government of India (2004–2009)

- 22nd ministry of Republic of India
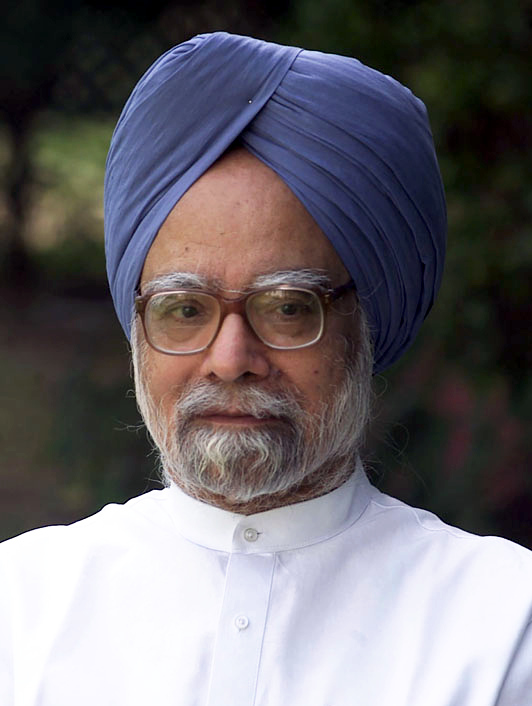
- Date formed: 22 May 2004
- Date dissolved: 22 May 2009

People and organisations
- Head of state: A. P. J. Abdul Kalam (until 25 July 2007); Pratibha Patil (from 25 July 2007)
- Head of government: Manmohan Singh
- Member parties: United Progressive Alliance: Indian National Congress; Nationalist Congress Party; Rashtriya Janata Dal; Lok Janshakti Party; Dravida Munnetra Kazagham; Indian Union Muslim League; Former: Bharat Rashtra Samithi (2004–2006); Jharkhand Mukti Morcha (2004–2005; 2006); Pattali Makkal Katchi (2004–2009)
- Status in legislature: Coalition
- Opposition party: Bharatiya Janata Party (NDA)
- Opposition leader: L. K. Advani (in Lok Sabha); Jaswant Singh (in Rajya Sabha)

History
- Election: 2004
- Outgoing election: 2009
- Legislature terms: 5 years, 0 days
- Predecessor: Third Vajpayee ministry
- Successor: Second Manmohan Singh ministry

The First Manmohan Singh ministry was the first Union Council of Ministers of India under the Premiership of Manmohan Singh. It was formed after the 2004 Indian general election were held in four phases during 20 April – 10 May 2004, to elect the 14th Lok Sabha, and it functioned from 2004 to May 2009. After the election Singh took the oath as the Prime Minister of India on 22 May 2004, and continued to hold the post till full term, the next Council of Ministers of the Republic of India was sworn in on 22 May 2009, when Singh started his second term in office as PM.

== Overview ==
This is a list of members of the Union Cabinet of the Government of India, 2004 to May 2009.

All ministers are based in offices of their respective Union Ministries in New Delhi. All Cabinet members are mandated by the constitution to be members of either house of the Parliament of India. In a departure from the norm the current Prime Minister, Manmohan Singh, is a member of the Upper House, the Rajya Sabha, and has remained so for the duration of his entire term (2004–2009).

== Council of ministers ==
=== Cabinet Ministers ===
Portfolio	Minister	Took office	Left office	Party	Remarks
Prime Minister; Minister of Personnel, Public Grievances and Pensions; Minister of Planning; Department of Atomic Energy; Department of Space; And also in-charge of all other important portfolios and policy issues not allocated to any Minister.	Manmohan Singh	22 May 2004	22 May 2009	INC	
Minister of Defence	Pranab Mukherjee	23 May 2004	24 October 2006	INC	
Minister of Defence	A. K. Antony	24 October 2006	22 May 2009	INC	
Minister of Human Resource Development	Arjun Singh	23 May 2004	22 May 2009	INC	
Minister of Agriculture; Minister of Consumer Affairs, Food and Public Distribution	Sharad Pawar	23 May 2004	22 May 2009	NCP	
Minister of Railways	Lalu Prasad Yadav	23 May 2004	22 May 2009	RJD	
Minister of Home Affairs	Shivraj Patil	23 May 2004	30 November 2008	INC	Resigned.
Minister of Home Affairs	P. Chidambaram	30 November 2008	22 May 2009	INC	
Minister of Chemicals and Fertilizers; Minister of Steel	Ram Vilas Paswan	23 May 2004	22 May 2009	LJP	
Minister of Parliamentary Affairs	Ghulam Nabi Azad	23 May 2004	1 November 2005	INC	Resigned.
Minister of Parliamentary Affairs	Priya Ranjan Dasmunsi	1 November 2005	6 April 2008	INC	Additional charge following resignation of Ghulam Nabi Azad.
Minister of Parliamentary Affairs	Vayalar Ravi	6 April 2008	22 May 2009	INC	
Minister of Urban Development	Ghulam Nabi Azad	23 May 2004	1 November 2005	INC	Resigned.
Minister of Urban Development	Manmohan Singh	1 November 2005	18 November 2005	INC	Prime Minister was responsible. Additional charge following resignation of Ghulam Nabi Azad.
Minister of Urban Development	S. Jaipal Reddy	18 November 2005	22 May 2009	INC	
Minister of Information and Broadcasting	S. Jaipal Reddy	23 May 2004	18 November 2005	INC	
Minister of Information and Broadcasting	Priya Ranjan Dasmunsi	18 November 2005	11 November 2008	INC	
Minister of Information and Broadcasting	Manmohan Singh	11 November 2008	22 May 2009	INC	Prime Minister was responsible. Additional charge during period of indisposition of Priya Ranjan Dasmunsi.
Minister of Culture	S. Jaipal Reddy	23 May 2004	29 January 2006	INC	
Minister of Culture	Ambika Soni	29 January 2006	22 May 2009	INC	
Minister of Labour and Employment	Sis Ram Ola	23 May 2004	27 November 2004	INC	
Minister of Labour and Employment	K. Chandrashekhar Rao	27 November 2004	24 August 2006	TRS	Resigned.
Minister of Labour and Employment	Manmohan Singh	24 August 2006	24 October 2006	INC	Prime Minister was responsible. Additional charge following resignation of K. Chandrashekhar Rao.
Minister of Labour and Employment	Oscar Fernandes	24 October 2006	3 March 2009	INC	Minister of State (I/C) was responsible. Resigned.
Minister of Labour and Employment	G. K. Vasan	3 March 2009	22 May 2009	INC	Minister of State (I/C) was responsible. Additional charge following resignation of Oscar Fernandes.
Minister of Finance	P. Chidambaram	23 May 2004	30 November 2008	INC	
Minister of Finance	Manmohan Singh	30 November 2008	24 January 2009	INC	Prime Minister was responsible.
Minister of Finance	Pranab Mukherjee	24 January 2009	22 May 2009	INC	
Minister of Small Scale Industries; Minister of Agro and Rural Industries	Mahavir Prasad	23 May 2004	9 May 2007	INC	Merged as Ministry of Micro, Small and Medium Enterprises.
Minister of Minister of Micro, Small and Medium Enterprise	Mahavir Prasad	9 May 2007	22 May 2009	INC	
Ministry of Tribal Affairs	P. R. Kyndiah	23 May 2004	22 May 2009	INC	
Minister of Development of North Eastern Region	P. R. Kyndiah	23 May 2004	24 October 2006	INC	
Minister of Development of North Eastern Region	Mani Shankar Aiyar	24 October 2006	22 May 2009	INC	
Minister of Road Transport and Highways	T. R. Baalu	23 May 2004	3 September 2004	DMK	Renamed as Ministry of Shipping, Road Transport and Highways.
Minister of Shipping, Road Transport and Highways	T. R. Baalu	3 September 2004	22 May 2009	DMK	
Minister of Textiles	Shankersinh Vaghela	23 May 2004	22 May 2009	INC	
Minister of External Affairs	Natwar Singh	23 May 2004	7 November 2005	INC	
Minister of External Affairs	Manmohan Singh	7 November 2005	24 October 2006	INC	Prime Minister was responsible.
Minister of External Affairs	Pranab Mukherjee	24 October 2006	22 May 2009	INC	
Minister of Commerce and Industry	Kamal Nath	23 May 2004	22 May 2009	INC	
Minister of Law and Justice	H. R. Bhardwaj	23 May 2004	22 May 2009	INC	
Minister of Power	P. M. Sayeed	23 May 2004	18 December 2005	INC	Died in office.
Minister of Power	Manmohan Singh	18 December 2005	29 January 2006	INC	Prime Minister was responsible. Additional charge following demise of P. M. Sayeed.
Minister of Power	Sushilkumar Shinde	29 January 2006	22 May 2009	INC	
Minister of Rural Development	Raghuvansh Prasad Singh	23 May 2004	22 May 2009	RJD	
Minister of Water Resources	Priya Ranjan Dasmunsi	23 May 2004	18 November 2005	INC	
Minister of Water Resources	Santosh Mohan Dev	18 November 2005	29 January 2006	INC	Minister of State (I/C) was responsible.
Minister of Water Resources	Saifuddin Soz	29 January 2006	22 May 2009	INC	
Minister of Petroleum and Natural Gas	Mani Shankar Aiyar	23 May 2004	29 January 2006	INC	
Minister of Petroleum and Natural Gas	Murli Deora	29 January 2006	22 May 2009	INC	
Minister of Panchayati Raj	Mani Shankar Aiyar	23 May 2004	22 May 2009	INC	
Minister of Youth Affairs and Sports	Sunil Dutt	23 May 2004	25 May 2005	INC	Died in office.
Minister of Youth Affairs and Sports	Manmohan Singh	25 May 2005	18 November 2005	INC	Prime Minister was responsible. Additional charge following demise of Sunil Dutt.
Minister of Youth Affairs and Sports	Oscar Fernandes	18 November 2005	29 January 2006	INC	Minister of State (I/C) was responsible.
Minister of Youth Affairs and Sports	Mani Shankar Aiyar	29 January 2006	6 April 2008	INC	
Minister of Youth Affairs and Sports	M. S. Gill	6 April 2008	22 May 2009	INC	Minister of State (I/C) was responsible.
Minister of Social Justice and Empowerment	Meira Kumar	23 May 2004	22 May 2009	INC	
Minister of Shipping	K. Chandrashekhar Rao	23 May 2004	25 May 2004	TRS	
Minister of Shipping	T. R. Baalu	25 May 2004	2 September 2004	DMK	Merged with Ministry of Road Transport and Highways.
Minister of Coal and Mines	Shibu Soren	23 May 2004	24 July 2004	JMM	Resigned.
Minister of Coal and Mines	Manmohan Singh	24 July 2004	27 November 2004	INC	Prime Minister was responsible. Bifurcated into Ministry of Ministry of Coal and Ministry of Mines.
Minister of Coal	Shibu Soren	27 November 2004	2 March 2005	JMM	Resigned.
Minister of Coal	Manmohan Singh	2 March 2005	29 January 2006	INC	Prime Minister was responsible. Additional charge following resignation of Shibu Soren.
Minister of Coal	Shibu Soren	29 January 2006	29 November 2006	JMM	Resigned.
Minister of Coal	Manmohan Singh	29 November 2006	22 May 2009	INC	Prime Minister was responsible. Additional charge following resignation of Shibu Soren.
Minister of Mines	Sis Ram Ola	27 November 2004	22 May 2009	INC	
Minister of Environment and Forests	A. Raja	23 May 2004	15 May 2007	DMK	
Minister of Environment and Forests	Manmohan Singh	15 May 2007	22 May 2009	INC	Prime Minister was responsible.
Minister of Communications and Information Technology	Dayanidhi Maran	23 May 2004	15 May 2007	DMK	Resigned.
Minister of Communications and Information Technology	A. Raja	15 May 2007	22 May 2009	DMK	Additional charge following resignation of Dayanidhi Maran.
Minister of Health and Family Welfare	Anbumani Ramadoss	23 May 2004	29 March 2009	PMK	Resigned.
Minister of Health and Family Welfare	Panabaka Lakshmi	29 March 2009	22 May 2009	INC	Minister of State (I/C) was responsible. Additional charge following resignation of Anbumani Ramadoss.
Minister of Heavy Industries and Public Enterprises	Santosh Mohan Dev	23 May 2004	29 January 2006	INC	Minister of State (I/C) was responsible.
Minister of Heavy Industries and Public Enterprises	Santosh Mohan Dev	29 January 2006	22 May 2009	INC	
Minister of Non-Resident Indian Affairs	Jagdish Tytler	23 May 2004	3 September 2004	INC	MoS (I/C) was responsible. Renamed as Ministry of Overseas Indian Affairs.
Minister of Overseas Indian Affairs	Jagdish Tytler	3 September 2004	10 August 2005	INC	MoS (I/C) was responsible. Resigned.
Minister of Overseas Indian Affairs	Manmohan Singh	10 August 2005	18 November 2005	INC	Prime Minister was responsible. Additional charge following resignation of Jagdish Tytler.
Minister of Overseas Indian Affairs	Oscar Fernandes	18 November 2005	29 January 2006	INC	Minister of State (I/C) was responsible.
Minister of Overseas Indian Affairs	Vayalar Ravi	29 January 2006	22 May 2009	INC	
Minister of Tourism	Renuka Chowdhury	23 May 2004	29 January 2006	INC	Minister of State (I/C) was responsible.
Minister of Tourism	Ambika Soni	29 January 2006	22 May 2009	INC	
Minister of Science and Technology	Kapil Sibal	23 May 2004	29 January 2006	INC	Minister of State (I/C) was responsible.
Minister of Science and Technology	Kapil Sibal	29 January 2006	22 May 2009	INC	
Minister of Ocean Development	Kapil Sibal	23 May 2004	29 January 2006	INC	Minister of State (I/C) was responsible.
Minister of Ocean Development	Kapil Sibal	29 January 2006	12 July 2006	INC	Renamed as Ministry of Earth Sciences.
Minister of Earth Sciences	Kapil Sibal	12 July 2006	22 May 2009	INC	
Minister of Company Affairs	Prem Chand Gupta	23 May 2004	29 January 2006	RJD	Minister of State (I/C) was responsible.
Minister of Company Affairs	Prem Chand Gupta	29 January 2006	9 May 2007	RJD	Renamed as Ministry of Corporate Affairs.
Minister of Corporate Affairs	Prem Chand Gupta	9 May 2007	22 May 2009	RJD	
Minister of Minority Affairs	A. R. Antulay	29 January 2006	22 May 2009	INC	
Minister without portfolio	K. Chandrashekhar Rao	25 May 2004	27 November 2004	TRS	
Minister without portfolio	Natwar Singh	7 November 2005	7 December 2005	INC	Resigned.
Minister without portfolio	Priya Ranjan Dasmunsi	11 November 2008	22 May 2009	INC	

=== Ministers of State (Independent charge) ===
Portfolio	Minister	Took office	Left office	Party	Remarks
Minister of State (Independent Charge) of Statistics and Programme Implementation	Oscar Fernandes	23 May 2004	29 January 2006	INC	
Minister of State (Independent Charge) of Statistics and Programme Implementation	G. K. Vasan	29 January 2006	22 May 2009	INC	
Minister of State (Independent Charge) of Food Processing Industries	Subodh Kant Sahay	23 May 2004	22 May 2009	INC	
Minister of State (Independent Charge) of Non-Conventional Energy Sources	Vilas Muttemwar	23 May 2004	20 October 2006	INC	Renamed as Ministry of New and Renewable Energy.
Minister of State (Independent Charge) of New and Renewable Energy	Vilas Muttemwar	20 October 2006	22 May 2009	INC	
Minister of State (Independent Charge) of Urban Employment and Poverty Allevation	Selja Kumari	23 May 2004	1 June 2006	INC	Renamed as Ministry of Housing and Urban Poverty Alleviation.
Minister of State (Independent Charge) of Housing and Urban Poverty Allevation	Selja Kumari	1 June 2006	22 May 2009	INC	
Minister of State (Independent Charge) of Civil Aviation	Praful Patel	23 May 2004	22 May 2009	NCP	
Minister of State (Independent Charge) of Women and Child Development	Renuka Chowdhury	29 January 2006	22 May 2009	INC	
Minister of State (Independent Charge) without portfolio	Oscar Fernandes	29 January 2006	24 October 2006	INC	

=== Ministers of State ===
Portfolio	Minister	Took office	Left office	Party	Remarks
Minister of State in the Ministry of External Affairs	E. Ahamed	23 May 2004	22 May 2009	IUML	
Minister of State in the Ministry of External Affairs	Rao Inderjit Singh	23 May 2004	29 January 2006	INC	
Minister of State in the Ministry of External Affairs	Anand Sharma	29 January 2006	22 May 2009	INC	
Minister of State in the Ministry of Personnel, Public Grievances and Pensions	Suresh Pachouri	23 May 2004	6 April 2008	INC	
Minister of State in the Ministry of Personnel, Public Grievances and Pensions	Prithviraj Chavan	6 April 2008	22 May 2009	INC	
Minister of State in the Ministry of Parliamentary Affairs	Suresh Pachouri	23 May 2004	6 April 2008	INC	
Minister of State in the Ministry of Parliamentary Affairs	Bijoy Krishna Handique	23 May 2004	6 April 2008	INC	
Minister of State in the Ministry of Parliamentary Affairs	Suryakanta Patil	23 May 2004	22 May 2009	NCP	
Minister of State in the Ministry of Parliamentary Affairs	Pawan Kumar Bansal	6 April 2008	22 May 2009	INC	
Minister of State in the Ministry of Parliamentary Affairs	V. Narayanasamy	6 April 2008	22 May 2009	INC	
Minister of State in the Ministry of Defence	Bijoy Krishna Handique	23 May 2004	29 January 2006	INC	
Minister of State in the Ministry of Defence	Rao Inderjit Singh	29 January 2006	22 May 2009	INC	
Minister of State in the Ministry of Defence	M. M. Pallam Raju	29 January 2006	22 May 2009	INC	
Minister of State in the Ministry of Health and Family Welfare	Panabaka Lakshmi	23 May 2004	29 March 2009	INC	
Minister of State in the Ministry of Coal and Mines	Dasari Narayan Rao	23 May 2004	27 November 2004	INC	Bifurcated into Ministry of Ministry of Coal and Ministry of Mines.
Minister of State in the Ministry of Coal	Dasari Narayan Rao	27 November 2004	6 April 2008	INC	
Minister of State in the Ministry of Coal	Santosh Bagrodia	6 April 2008	22 May 2009	INC	
Minister of State in the Ministry of Mines	Dasari Narayan Rao	27 November 2004	7 February 2006	INC	
Minister of State in the Ministry of Mines	T. Subbarami Reddy	31 January 2006	6 April 2008	INC	
Minister of State in the Ministry of Mines	Bijoy Krishna Handique	6 April 2008	22 May 2009	INC	
Minister of State in the Ministry of Communications and Information Technology	Shakeel Ahmad	23 May 2004	6 April 2008	INC	
Minister of State in the Ministry of Communications and Information Technology	Jyotiraditya Scindia	6 April 2008	22 May 2009	INC	
Minister of State in the Ministry of Railways	Naranbhai Rathwa	23 May 2004	22 May 2009	INC	
Minister of State in the Ministry of Railways	R. Velu	23 May 2004	29 March 2009	PMK	Resigned.
Minister of State in the Ministry of Chemicals and Fertilizers	K. Rahman Khan	23 May 2004	20 July 2004	INC	Resigned.
Minister of State in the Ministry of Chemicals and Fertilizers	Bijoy Krishna Handique	29 January 2006	22 May 2009	INC	
Minister of State in the Ministry of Road Transport and Highways	K. H. Muniyappa	23 May 2004	3 September 2004	INC	Renamed as Ministry of Shipping, Road Transport and Highways.
Minister of State in the Ministry of Shipping, Road Transport and Highways	K. H. Muniyappa	3 September 2004	22 May 2009	INC	
Minister of State in the Ministry of Planning	M. V. Rajasekharan	23 May 2004	6 April 2008	INC	
Minister of State in the Ministry of Planning	V. Narayanasamy	6 April 2008	22 May 2009	INC	
Minister of State in the Ministry of Agriculture; Minister of State in the Ministry of Consumer Affairs, Food and Public Distribution	Kantilal Bhuria	23 May 2004	22 May 2009	INC	
Minister of State in the Ministry of Agriculture; Minister of State in the Ministry of Consumer Affairs, Food and Public Distribution	Akhilesh Prasad Singh	23 May 2004	22 May 2009	RJD	
Minister of State in the Ministry of Agriculture; Minister of State in the Ministry of Consumer Affairs, Food and Public Distribution	Mohammed Taslimuddin	25 May 2004	22 May 2009	RJD	
Minister of State in the Ministry of Home Affairs	Manikrao Hodlya Gavit	23 May 2004	6 April 2008	INC	
Minister of State in the Ministry of Home Affairs	Shriprakash Jaiswal	23 May 2004	22 May 2009	INC	
Minister of State in the Ministry of Home Affairs	S. Regupathy	23 May 2004	15 May 2007	DMK	
Minister of State in the Ministry of Home Affairs	V. Radhika Selvi	18 May 2007	22 May 2009	DMK	
Minister of State in the Ministry of Home Affairs	Shakeel Ahmad	6 April 2008	22 May 2009	INC	
Minister of State in the Prime Minister's Office	Prithviraj Chavan	23 May 2004	22 May 2009	INC	
Minister of State in the Ministry of Heavy Industries and Public Enterprises	Mohammed Taslimuddin	23 May 2004	25 May 2004	RJD	
Minister of State in the Ministry of Heavy Industries and Public Enterprises	Kanti Singh	29 January 2006	6 April 2008	RJD	
Minister of State in the Ministry of Heavy Industries and Public Enterprises	Raghunath Jha	6 April 2008	22 May 2009	RJD	
Minister of State in the Ministry of Rural Development	Suryakanta Patil	23 May 2004	22 May 2009	NCP	
Minister of State in the Ministry of Rural Development	Ale Narendra	23 May 2004	24 August 2006	TRS	Resigned.
Minister of State in the Ministry of Rural Development	Chandra Sekhar Sahu	24 October 2006	22 May 2009	INC	
Minister of State in the Ministry of Human Resource Development	Mohammad Ali Ashraf Fatmi	23 May 2004	22 May 2009	RJD	
Minister of State in the Ministry of Human Resource Development	Kanti Singh	23 May 2004	29 January 2006	RJD	
Minister of State in the Ministry of Human Resource Development	Daggubati Purandeswari	29 January 2006	22 May 2009	INC	
Minister of State in the Ministry of Commerce and Industry	S. S. Palanimanickam	23 May 2004	25 May 2004	DMK	
Minister of State in the Ministry of Commerce and Industry	E. V. K. S. Elangovan	25 May 2004	29 January 2006	INC	
Minister of State in the Ministry of Commerce and Industry	Jairam Ramesh	31 January 2006	25 February 2009	INC	Resigned.
Minister of State in the Ministry of Commerce and Industry	Ashwani Kumar	29 January 2006	22 May 2009	INC	
Minister of State in the Ministry of Law and Justice	K. Venkatapathy	23 May 2004	22 May 2009	DMK	
Minister of State in the Ministry of Social Justice and Empowerment	Subbulakshmi Jagadeesan	23 May 2004	22 May 2009	DMK	
Minister of State in the Ministry of Petroleum and Natural Gas	E. V. K. S. Elangovan	23 May 2004	25 May 2004	INC	
Minister of State in the Ministry of Petroleum and Natural Gas	Dinsha Patel	31 January 2006	22 May 2009	INC	
Minister of State in the Ministry of Environment and Forests	Namo Narain Meena	23 May 2004	22 May 2009	INC	
Minister of State in the Ministry of Environment and Forests	S. Regupathy	15 May 2007	22 May 2009	DMK	
Minister of State in the Ministry of Water Resources	Jay Prakash Narayan Yadav	23 May 2004	6 November 2005	RJD	Resigned.
Minister of State in the Ministry of Water Resources	Jay Prakash Narayan Yadav	24 October 2006	22 May 2009	RJD	
Minister of State in the Ministry of Finance	S. S. Palanimanickam	25 May 2004	22 May 2009	DMK	
Minister of State in the Ministry of Finance	Pawan Kumar Bansal	29 January 2006	22 May 2009	INC	
Minister of State in the Ministry of Textiles	E. V. K. S. Elangovan	29 January 2006	22 May 2009	INC	
Minister of State in the Ministry of Urban Development	Ajay Maken	29 January 2006	22 May 2009	INC	
Minister of State in the Ministry of Labour and Employment	Chandra Sekhar Sahu	29 January 2006	24 October 2006	INC	
Minister of State in the Ministry of Steel	Akhilesh Das	29 January 2006	6 April 2008	INC	
Minister of State in the Ministry of Steel	Jitin Prasada	6 April 2008	22 May 2009	INC	
Minister of State in the Ministry of Information and Broadcasting	M. H. Ambareesh	24 October 2006	22 May 2009	INC	
Minister of State in the Ministry of Information and Broadcasting	Anand Sharma	18 October 2008	22 May 2009	INC	
Minister of State in the Ministry of Tourism; Minister of State in the Ministry of Culture	Kanti Singh	6 April 2008	22 May 2009	RJD	
Minister of State in the Ministry of Power	Jairam Ramesh	6 April 2008	25 February 2009	INC	Resigned.
Minister of State in the Ministry of Tribal Affairs	Rameshwar Oraon	6 April 2008	22 May 2009	INC	
Minister of State without portfolio	T. Subbarami Reddy	29 January 2006	31 January 2006	INC	
Minister of State without portfolio	Jairam Ramesh	29 January 2006	31 January 2006	INC	
Minister of State without portfolio	Dinsha Patel	29 January 2006	31 January 2006	INC	

== Demographics ==
Representation of cabinet ministers by party
1. Indian National Congress (73.3%)
2. Rashtriya Janata Dal (12.0%)
3. Dravida Munnetra Kazhagam (8.00%)
4. Nationalist Congress Party (4.00%)
5. Lok Janshakti Party (1.33%)
6. Indian Union Muslim League (1.33%)

=== Parties ===
Party	Cabinet Ministers	Ministers of State (I/C)	Ministers of State	Total numbers of ministers
INC	23 (Note: Including Prime Minister)	7	25	55
RJD	3	0	6	9
NCP	1	1	1	3
DMK	2	0	4	6
LJP	1	0	0	1
IUML	0	0	1	1
Total	30	8	37	75

=== States ===
State	Cabinet Ministers	Ministers of State (I/C)	Ministers of State	Total number of ministers	Name of ministers
Andhra Pradesh	1	2	2	5	S. Jaipal Reddy; Renuka Chowdhury; Panabaka Lakshmi; M. M. Pallam Raju; Daggubati Purandeswari
Assam	2	—	1	3	Manmohan Singh (Prime Minister); Santosh Mohan Dev; Bijoy Krishna Handique
Bihar	5	—	7	12	Lalu Prasad Yadav; Ram Vilas Paswan; Raghuvansh Prasad Singh; Meira Kumar; Prem Chand Gupta; Shakeel Ahmad; Mohammed Taslimuddin; Mohammad Ali Ashraf Fatmi; Kanti Singh; Jay Prakash Narayan Yadav; Akhilesh Prasad Singh; Raghunath Jha
Gujarat	1	—	2	3	Shankersinh Vaghela; Naranbhai Rathwa; Dinsha Patel
Haryana	1	1	1	3	H. R. Bhardwaj; Selja Kumari; Rao Inderjit Singh
Himachal Pradesh	—	—	1	1	Anand Sharma
Jammu and Kashmir	1	—	—	1	Saifuddin Soz
Jharkhand	—	1	1	2	Subodh Kant Sahay; Rameshwar Oraon
Karnataka	—	—	2	2	K. H. Muniyappa; M. H. Ambareesh
Kerala	2	—	1	3	A. K. Antony; Vayalar Ravi; E. Ahamed
Madhya Pradesh	2	—	2	4	Arjun Singh; Kamal Nath; Kantilal Bhuria; Jyotiraditya Scindia
Maharashtra	4	2	2	8	Sharad Pawar; A. R. Antulay; Sushilkumar Shinde; Murli Deora; Vilas Muttemwar; Praful Patel; Prithviraj Chavan; Suryakanta Patil
Meghalaya	1	—	—	1	P. R. Kyndiah
Odisha	—	—	1	1	Chandra Sekhar Sahu
Punjab	1	1	1	3	Ambika Soni; M. S. Gill; Ashwani Kumar
Rajasthan	1	—	2	3	Sis Ram Ola; Namo Narain Meena; Santosh Bagrodia
Tamil Nadu	4	1	6	11	P. Chidambaram; T. R. Baalu; Mani Shankar Aiyar; A. Raja; G. K. Vasan; S. S. Palanimanickam; S. Regupathy; K. Venkatapathy; Subbulakshmi Jagadeesan; E. V. K. S. Elangovan; V. Radhika Selvi
Uttar Pradesh	1	—	2	3	Mahavir Prasad; Shriprakash Jaiswal; Jitin Prasada
West Bengal	2	—	—	2	Pranab Mukherjee; Priya Ranjan Dasmunsi
Chandigarh	—	—	1	1	Pawan Kumar Bansal
Delhi	1	—	1	2	Kapil Sibal; Ajay Maken
Puducherry	—	—	1	1	V. Narayanasamy
Total	30	8	37	75	

== Demographics of former minister ==
Party	Cabinet Ministers	Ministers of State (I/C)	Ministers of State	Total numbers of ministers
INC	6	2	8	16
TRS	1	0	1	2
PMK	1	0	1	2
JMM	1	0	0	1
Total	9	2	10	21

=== States ===
State	Cabinet Ministers	Ministers of State (I/C)	Ministers of State	Total number of ministers	Name of ministers
Andhra Pradesh	1	—	4	5	K. Chandrashekhar Rao; Dasari Narayan Rao; Ale Narendra; T. Subbarami Reddy; Jairam Ramesh
Jammu and Kashmir	1	—	—	1	Ghulam Nabi Azad
Jharkhand	1	—	—	1	Shibu Soren
Karnataka	—	1	2	3	Oscar Fernandes; K. Rahman Khan; M. V. Rajasekharan
Madhya Pradesh	—	—	1	1	Suresh Pachouri
Maharashtra	2	—	1	3	Shivraj Patil; Sunil Dutt; Manikrao Hodlya Gavit
Rajasthan	1	—	—	1	Natwar Singh
Tamil Nadu	2	—	1	3	Dayanidhi Maran; Anbumani Ramadoss; R. Velu
Uttar Pradesh	—	—	1	1	Akhilesh Das
Delhi	1	1	—	2	P. M. Sayeed; Jagdish Tytler
Total	9	2	10	21	

== See also ==
- United Progressive Alliance
- List of members of the 14th Lok Sabha
- Union Council of Ministers
- 2008 Lok Sabha vote of confidence
