= Selvaraj =

Selvaraj may refer to:

- D. Selvaraj, Indian politician
- Selvaraj (politician), also known as Kavithapithan, Indian politician
- V. Selvaraj, Singaporean athlete
