= K.N.Balakumar =

Indian politician

K. N. Balakumar

Member of the DMK IT wing
- Incumbent
- Assumed office 25 May 2023
- President: M. K. Stalin
- ITW Secretary: T. R. B. Rajaa

Member of the DMK Gen Z
- Incumbent
- Assumed office 19 July 2026

Personal details
- Born: Balakumar Nagarajan; 25 May 1997 (age 29) Namakkal, Tamil Nadu, India
- Party: Dravida Munnetra Kazhagam
- Occupation: Politician
- Website: www.k.n.balakumar.in

K.N.Balakumar (born 25 May 1997) is an Indian politician for Dravida Munnetra Kazhagam. He also holds the position of the party's IT Wing member. He joined Dravida Munnetra Kazhagam in 2021.
