= S. S. Palanimanickam =

Indian politician (born 1950)

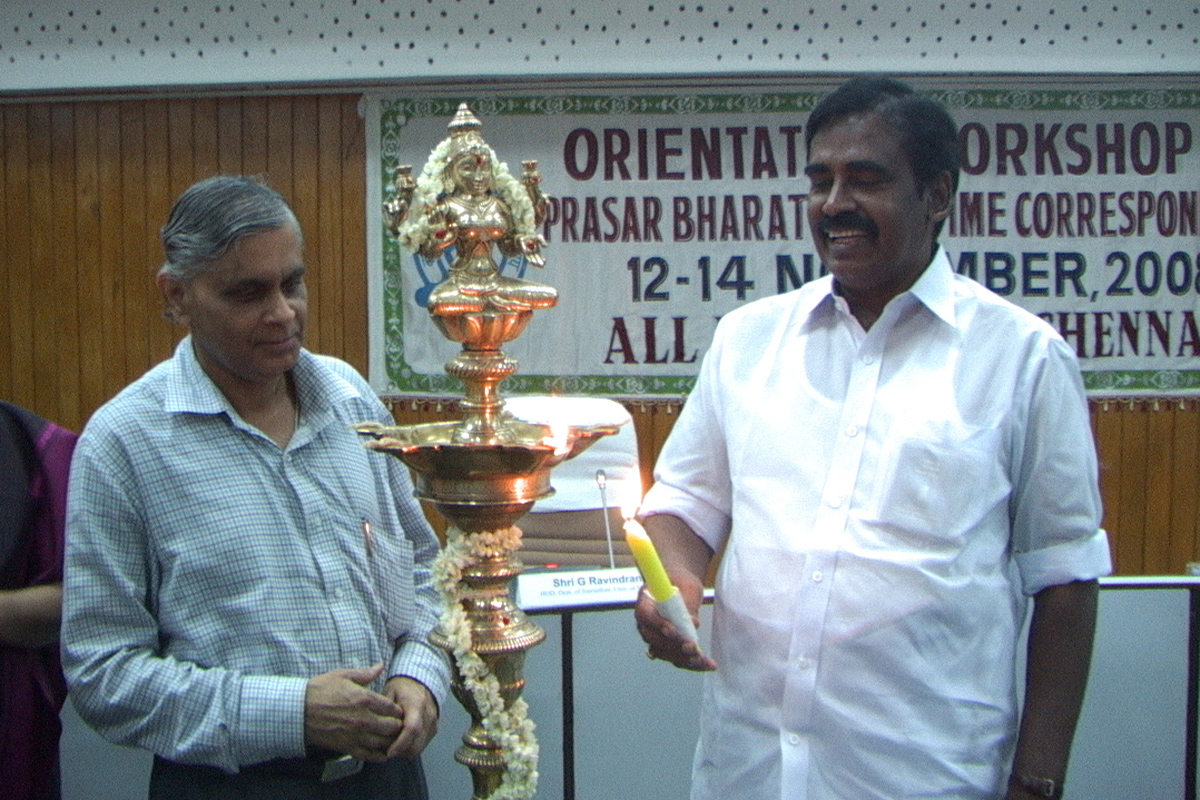

Member of Parliament, Lok Sabha
- In office 23 May 2019 – 4 June 2024
- Preceded by: K. Parasuraman
- Succeeded by: S. Murasoli
- In office 10 May 1996 — 16 May 2014
- Preceded by: K. Thulasi Vandaayar
- Succeeded by: K. Parasuraman
- Constituency: Thanjavur, Tamil Nadu

Minister of State for Finance
- In office 22 May 2004 – 21 March 2013
- Prime Minister: Manmohan Singh
- Finance Minister: P. Chidambaram

Personal details
- Born: 15 August 1950 (age 76) Nattani village, Pudukkottai, Madras State (Now Tamil Nadu)
- Party: DMK
- Spouse: P. Maheswari
- Children: 1 daughter
- Parent: S. Subbaiya (father)
- Education: Madras Law College

S. Subbaiya Palanimanickam (born 15 August 1950) is an Indian politician from Tamil Nadu. He was a member of the 17th Lok Sabha of India. He represented the Thanjavur constituency of Tamil Nadu from the Dravida Munnetra Kazhagam (DMK) party. He was the Thanjavur district secretary of the Dravida Munnetra Kazhagam.

He had been a member of parliament for five times, winning five continuous elections starting 1996. He was also the minister of state in the ministry of finance from 2004 to March 2012 when the DMK pulled out of the ruling UPA coalition government. Internal rivalry in the DMK party emerged between T. R. Baalu and S.S. Palanimanickam in 2012, when T. R. Baalu initiated a survey for railway lines in Thanjavur district and T. R. Baalu wished to contest from Thanjavur in 2014 Indian general election and the DMK controversially denied Palanimanickam a ticket however Baalu lost the elections. However Palanimanickam was given the party ticket in the 2019 Indian general election and was elected to the Lok Sabha, lower house of the Parliament of India from Thanjavur again.

== Career as a politician ==
Palanimanickam joined the DMK during the Anti-Hindi agitation of 1965 through his father Subbiah was a staunch Congress party worker and an aide of R Venkataraman and G K Moopanar. General-Secretary, All India Peace and Solidarity, Tamil Nadu Unit; His interest are toward working for the upliftment of weaker sections of the society and has special interests in rural education and upliftment of the rural youth. He led a delegation of students to the then U.S.S.R. for attending youth festival, attended UN General Assembly in 2001-02 in New York, attended SAARC Parliamentarians Conference in Bangladesh, visited Egypt and South Africa as member of Indian Parliamentary Delegation during 13th Lok Sabha, visited Arab Countries as member of Peace Delegation in 2004. In 2012, S. S. Palanimanickam signed a Tax Information Exchange Agreement with Monaco, being the 9th TIEA signed by India.

== Elections contested and positions held ==
Year	Constituency	Result	Vote percentage	Opposition Candidate	Opposition Party	Opposition vote percentage
1996	Thanjavur	Won	58.8	K. Thulasaya Vandayar	INC	28.58
1998	Thanjavur	Won	51.81	L. Ganesan	MDMK	44.11
1999	Thanjavur	Won	45.39	K.Thangamuthu	ADMK	40.31
2004	Thanjavur	Won	56.58	K.Thangamuthu	ADMK	39.77
2009	Thanjavur	Won	50.55	Durai Balakrishnan	MDMK	37.95
2019	Thanjavur	Won	55.6	N. R. Natarajan	TMC	20.9

Year	Positions Held
1996	Elected to 11th Lok Sabha
1996-97	Member, Committee on Transport and Tourism; Member Railway Convention Committee; Member Zonal Railways Users Consultative Committee, Ministry of Railways; Member, Consultative Committee, Ministry of Communications
1996-98	Member, Select Committee on the Constitution (Scheduled Tribes) Order (Amendment) Bill, 1996
1997-98	Member, Joint Committee on the Empowerment of Women
1998	Re-elected to 12th Lok Sabha (2nd term)
1998-99	Member Committee on Industry; Member Committee on Private Members’ Bills and Resolutions; Member Consultative Committee, Ministry of Petroleum and Natural Gas; Member Zonal Railway Users Consultative Committee, Ministry of Railways
1999	Re-elected to 13th Lok Sabha (3rd term)
1999–2000	Chairman, Committee on Agriculture; Member Committee of Privileges; Member, Joint Committee on Patents (Second Amendment) Bill, 1999
1999–2004	Member, General Purposes Committee
2000–2004	Member, Consultative Committee, Ministry of Civil Aviation
2004	Re-elected to 14th Lok Sabha (4th term)
2009	Re-elected to 15th Lok Sabha (5th term)
2004–2012	Union Minister of State, Finance; Literary Artistic & Scientific Accomplishments; President, Tamil Centre, Thanjavur (for more than ten years); District Secreatary of D.M.K.

== Controversies ==
In February 2012, CBI lodged strong protest with CVC on the "dirty tricks" of certain Income Tax officials to intimidate crucial witnesses in the 2G spectrum case allegedly at the behest of Minister of State (Finance) SS Palanimanickam. Dr. Swamy, one of the petitioners in the case, said he would approach Supreme Court on this matter.

Internal rivalry in the DMK party emerged between Baalu and S.S. Palanimanickam, the MP from Thanjavur constituency and the district secretary of the DMK in Thanjavur. During October 2012, Palanimackam came out open in the media to criticize his senior colleague for showing undue interest in Thanjavur, while he could have done it was his Sriperumbudur constituency. He accused Baalu for bringing all the railways schemes to Thanjavur to get the seat in Thanjavur for 2014 general elections. Referring to the internal conflict, the party leader Karunanidhi came out in the open stating "When I go to sleep, such factional feuds engulf me and make me sleepless". Baalu being the Chairman of the Parliamentary Standing Committee on Railways, initiated the survey for the 47 km (29 mi) Thanjavur-Pattukottai railway line and the 42 km (26 mi) Mannargudi-Pattukottai rail project, which is believed to have created the conflict.
