= M. Govindarasu =

Indian politician

Member-Tamil Nadu Legislative Assembly
- In office 2016–2021
- Preceded by: Arun Pandian
- Succeeded by: Peravurani N. Ashokkumar
- Constituency: Peravurani

Personal details
- Born: 1 August 1950 Peravurani
- Party: All India Anna Dravida Munnetra Kazhagam
- Profession: Farmer

M. Govindarasu is an Indian politician and a former Member of the Tamil Nadu Legislative Assembly (MLA). He hails from Peravurani town in Thanjavur District. Govindarasu, who studied up to the tenth standard, belongs to the All India Anna Dravida Munnetra Kazhagam (AIADMK) party. He contested and won the Mayiladuthurai Assembly constituency in the 2016 Tamil Nadu Legislative Assembly election, becoming an MLA.

== Electoral Performance ==
=== 2016 ===
2016 Tamil Nadu Legislative Assembly election: Peravurani
Party	Candidate	Votes	%	±%
AIADMK	M. Govindarasu	73,908	45.65%	New
DMK	Peravurani N. Ashokkumar	72,913	45.04%	New
CPI	T. Thamayanthi	5,816	3.59%	New
BJP	R. Elango	4,612	2.85%	+0.93
NTK	K. Baladhandayutham	1,602	0.99%	New
NOTA	NOTA	1,294	0.80%	New
Margin of victory		995	0.61%	−4.52%
Turnout		161,897	78.83%	−1.98%
Registered electors		205,368		
AIADMK gain from DMDK		Swing	9.23%	
