= S. Kamaraj =

Indian politician

Member of the Tamil Nadu Legislative Assembly
- Incumbent
- Assumed office 6 May 2026
- Preceded by: T. R. B. Rajaa
- Constituency: Mannargudi

Personal details
- Party: Independent
- Other political affiliations: TVK-led Alliance (Since 2026); Amma Makkal Munnetra Kazhagam (2018-2026); All India Anna Dravida Munnetra Kazhagam (Until 2018)
- Parent: R. Soundarajan (father)
- Occupation: Politician, Educator, Industry and Agriculture

Soundarajan Kamaraj is an Indian politician who is a Member of the 17th Legislative Assembly of Tamil Nadu. He was elected from Mannargudi as an AMMK candidate in 2026.

== Elections contested ==
2026 Tamil Nadu Legislative Assembly election: Mannargudi
Party	Candidate	Votes	%	±%
AMMK	S. Kamaraj	68,416	35.25	▲14.20
DMK	T. R. B. Rajaa	66,850	34.44	▼10.90
TVK	U. V. M. Rajarajan	44,266	22.81	New
NTK	R. Bharathiselvan	8,240	4.25	▼1.18
AIPTMMK	S. Rasupillai	1,949	1.00	New
NOTA	None of the above	405	0.21	▼0.29
Margin of victory		1,566	0.81	▼18.64
Turnout		1,94,100	82.75	▲8.81
Registered electors		2,34,554		▼25,488
AMMK gain from DMK		Swing	▲14.20	

He was elected as a Member of the Tamil Nadu Legislative Assembly from the Mannargudi constituency in the 2026 Tamil Nadu Legislative Assembly election. In the election, he defeated Dravida Munnetra Kazhagam (DMK) candidate T. R. B. Rajaa to win the constituency.

== Current affiliation ==
AMMK General Secretary T.T.V expelled him for supporting and praising TVK President, Joseph Vijay in the legislative assembly and soon after that Kamraj announced support for the TVK led Alliance.
