= M. Ambigapathi =

Indian politician

M. Ambigapathi is an Indian politician and former Member of the Legislative Assembly of Tamil Nadu. He was elected to the Tamil Nadu legislative assembly as a Communist Party of India candidate from Mannargudi constituency in 1977, and 1980 elections
