= M. R. Govindan =

Indian politician

M. R. Govindan (Tamil: எம்.ஆர். கோவிந்தன்) is an Indian politician and former Member of the Legislative Assembly of Tamil Nadu. He was elected to the Tamil Nadu legislative assembly as an Anna Dravida Munnetra Kazhagam candidate from Peravurani constituency in the 1977, 1980, and 1984 elections.
