= S. V. Thirugnana Sambandam =

Indian politician

S. V. Thirugnana Sambandam is an Indian politician and former Member of the Legislative Assembly of Tamil Nadu. He was elected to the Tamil Nadu legislative assembly as a Tamil Maanila Congress (Moopanar) candidate from Peravurani constituency in the 1996 and 2001 elections.
