= R. Singaram =

Indian politician

R. Singaram is an Indian politician and former Member of the Legislative Assembly of Tamil Nadu. He was elected to the Tamil Nadu legislative assembly as an Indian National Congress candidate from Peravurani constituency in 1989, and 1991 elections.
