= Peravurani Assembly constituency =

One of the 234 State Legislative Assembly Constituencies in Tamil Nadu, in India

Coordinates: 10.4212322°N 79.1651449°E

Peravurani
- Constituency No. 177 for the Tamil Nadu Legislative Assembly

Constituency details
- Country: India
- Region: South India
- State: Tamil Nadu
- District: Thanjavur
- Lok Sabha constituency: Thanjavur
- Established: 1967
- Total electors: 2,13,974
- Reservation: None

Member of Legislative Assembly
- 17th Tamil Nadu Legislative Assembly
- Incumbent Ashokkumar.N
- Party: DMK
- Elected year: 2026

Peravurani is a state assembly constituency in Tamil Nadu. Peravurani Assembly constituency was created in 1967 by the delimitation of Pattukkottai Assembly constituency. It elects a member to the Tamil Nadu Legislative Assembly once every five years. Since the 1967 elections, Anna Dravida Munnetra Kazhagam has won the assembly seat three times (in 1984, 2006, 2016 state elections), Dravida Munnetra Kazhagam has also won the assembly seat three times (in 1967, 1977 and 1980, 2021), Tamil Maanila Congress (Moopanar) has won two times in the 1996 and 2001 elections and Indian National Congress has won the seat two times (in 1989 and 1991) and Desiya Murpokku Dravidar Kazhagam won the seat in 2011 election. The current member of legislative assembly N. Ashok Kumar from Dravida Munnetra Kazhagam. It is one of the 234 State Legislative Assembly Constituencies in Tamil Nadu, in India.

== Notable candidatures ==
Seruvai. Pa. Malaiyappan, who belongs to AIADMK Party, has led the party in Peravurani in its early stages; he led the party front as union secretary (AIADMK), He had won as Union Chairman when votes were elected directly by people and become district council member twice. When he was all set to become MLA candidate, he died due to cardiac arrest in 2002.

- Kuzha. Chellaiya is an Indian politician and a Member of the Legislative Assembly of Tamil Nadu who was born and brought up in Mudhukadu Village of Peravurani taluk; who worked in both major political parties of Tamil Nadu, Dravida Munnetra Kazhagam and Anna Dravida Munnetra Kazhagam in different times. He was elected to the Tamil Nadu legislative assembly as an independent candidate from Peravurani Assembly constituency in the 1971 state assembly elections. He is the only Independent candidate, elected as a Member of legislative assembly from Peravurani Assembly constituency.

== Elected members ==
The first election in Peravurani Assembly constituency was conducted in the year of 1967. The First Member of legislative assembly from Peravurani constituency was M. K. Krishnamoorthy from Dravida Munnetra Kazhagam.

Year	Name	Party
1967	M. Krishnamoorthi	Dravida Munnetra Kazhagam
1971	Kuzha. Chellaiya	Independent politician
1977	M. R. Govindan	All India Anna Dravida Munnetra Kazhagam
1980	M. R. Govindan	All India Anna Dravida Munnetra Kazhagam
1984	M. R. Govindan	All India Anna Dravida Munnetra Kazhagam
1989	R. Singaram	Indian National Congress
1991	R. Singaram	Indian National Congress
1996	S. V. Thirugnana Sambandam	Tamil Maanila Congress (Moopanar)
2001	S. V. Thirugnana Sambandam	Tamil Maanila Congress (Moopanar)
2006	M. V. R. Veera Kabilan	All India Anna Dravida Munnetra Kazhagam
2011	Arun Pandian	Desiya Murpokku Dravida Kazhagam
2016	M. Govindarasu	All India Anna Dravida Munnetra Kazhagam
2021	N. Ashokkumar	Dravida Munnetra Kazhagam
2026	N. Ashokkumar	Dravida Munnetra Kazhagam

== Election results ==
Vote share of winning candidates
2026	34.56%
2021	52.40%
2016	45.65%
2011	36.42%
2006	41.75%
2001	54.70%
1996	58.68%
1991	67.56%
1989	29.59%
1984	55.46%
1980	58.56%
1977	38.80%
1971	36.46%
1967	45.40%

=== 2026 ===
2026 Tamil Nadu Legislative Assembly election: Peravurani
Party	Candidate	Votes	%	±%
DMK	Ashokkumar.N	60,919	34.56	▼17.84
AIADMK	Govi Elango	57,757	32.77	▼5.82
TVK	D. Chandrakandeeban	45,576	25.86	New
NTK	Bhuvana Maniyarasan	9,122	5.17	▼1.98
NOTA	NOTA	695	0.39	
Margin of victory		3,162	1.79	▼12.03
Turnout		1,76,274	82.38	▲5.13
Registered electors		2,13,974		▼6,188
DMK hold		Swing	▼17.84	

=== 2021 ===
2021 Tamil Nadu Legislative Assembly election: Peravurani
Party	Candidate	Votes	%	±%
DMK	Peravurani N. Ashokkumar	89,130	52.40%	+7.37
AIADMK	S. V. Thirugnana Sambandam	65,627	38.59%	−7.07
NTK	K. Delipan	12,154	7.15%	+6.16
DMDK	M. Sivakumar	1,623	0.95%	New
Margin of victory		23,503	13.82%	13.20%
Turnout		170,080	77.25%	−1.58%
Rejected ballots		46	0.03%	
Registered electors		220,162		
DMK gain from AIADMK		Swing	6.75%	

=== 2016 ===
2016 Tamil Nadu Legislative Assembly election: Peravurani
Party	Candidate	Votes	%	±%
AIADMK	M. Govindarasu	73,908	45.65%	New
DMK	Peravurani N. Ashokkumar	72,913	45.04%	New
CPI	T. Thamayanthi	5,816	3.59%	New
BJP	R. Elango	4,612	2.85%	+0.93
NTK	K. Baladhandayutham	1,602	0.99%	New
NOTA	NOTA	1,294	0.80%	New
Margin of victory		995	0.61%	−4.52%
Turnout		161,897	78.83%	−1.98%
Registered electors		205,368		
AIADMK gain from DMDK		Swing	9.23%	

=== 2011 ===
2011 Tamil Nadu Legislative Assembly election: Peravurani
Party	Candidate	Votes	%	±%
DMDK	Arun Pandian	51,010	36.42%	+21.3
INC	K. Mahendran	43,816	31.29%	−7.68
Independent	S. V. Thirugnana Sambandam	25,137	17.95%	New
Independent	V. Subramaniyan	7,470	5.33%	New
JMM	K. Thangamuthu	4,453	3.18%	New
BJP	R. Elango	2,691	1.92%	−0.39
Independent	M. Balasubramaniyan	1,465	1.05%	New
BSP	V. Mayalagu	1,432	1.02%	New
Independent	K. M. Kalemuthu	1,430	1.02%	New
Independent	A. Muthukumaran	1,140	0.81%	New
Margin of victory		7,194	5.14%	2.36%
Turnout		140,044	80.81%	3.82%
Registered electors		173,298		
DMDK gain from AIADMK		Swing	-5.33%	

=== 2006 ===
2006 Tamil Nadu Legislative Assembly election: Peravurani
Party	Candidate	Votes	%	±%
AIADMK	M. V. R. Veerakapilan	54,183	41.75%	New
INC	S. V. Thirugnana Sambandam	50,577	38.97%	New
DMDK	V. S. K. Palanivel	19,627	15.12%	New
BJP	D. Thiyagarajan	2,998	2.31%	New
Independent	M. Sathiya Moorthy	1,320	1.02%	New
Independent	M. Anthonyraja	1,076	0.83%	New
Margin of victory		3,606	2.78%	−21.69%
Turnout		129,781	76.99%	7.31%
Registered electors		168,565		
AIADMK gain from TMC(M)		Swing	-12.95%	

=== 2001 ===
2001 Tamil Nadu Legislative Assembly election: Peravurani
Party	Candidate	Votes	%	±%
TMC(M)	S. V. Thirugnana Sambandam	64,076	54.70%	New
DMK	Kuzha Chellaiah	35,417	30.24%	New
Independent	R. Singaram	14,453	12.34%	New
Independent	C. Murugaiyan	3,191	2.72%	New
Margin of victory		28,659	24.47%	−8.71%
Turnout		117,137	69.69%	−8.55%
Registered electors		168,212		
TMC(M) hold		Swing	-3.98%	

=== 1996 ===
1996 Tamil Nadu Legislative Assembly election: Peravurani
Party	Candidate	Votes	%	±%
TMC(M)	S. V. Thirugnana Sambandam	70,112	58.68%	New
INC	K. Sakthivel	30,472	25.50%	−42.06
MDMK	M. K. Lenin	16,151	13.52%	New
BJP	Pon. Ramasamy	1,475	1.23%	−1.38
Independent	K. Kandasamy	944	0.79%	New
Margin of victory		39,640	33.18%	−5.65%
Turnout		119,484	78.24%	2.24%
Registered electors		162,336		
TMC(M) gain from INC		Swing	-8.88%	

=== 1991 ===
1991 Tamil Nadu Legislative Assembly election: Peravurani
Party	Candidate	Votes	%	±%
INC	R. Singaram	77,504	67.56%	+37.97
DMK	M. R. Govindan	32,962	28.73%	−0.2
BJP	U. Samiyappan	2,996	2.61%	New
Margin of victory		44,542	38.83%	38.16%
Turnout		114,717	76.00%	−8.02%
Registered electors		154,246		
INC hold		Swing	37.97%	

=== 1989 ===
1989 Tamil Nadu Legislative Assembly election: Peravurani
Party	Candidate	Votes	%	±%
INC	R. Singaram	33,467	29.59%	New
DMK	M. Krishna Moorthy	32,716	28.93%	New
AIADMK	Chellaiah Kuzha	27,646	24.45%	−31.02
AIADMK	M. R. Govindan	18,762	16.59%	−38.87
Margin of victory		751	0.66%	−28.04%
Turnout		113,093	84.02%	−0.01%
Registered electors		136,856		
INC gain from AIADMK		Swing	-25.87%	

=== 1984 ===
1984 Tamil Nadu Legislative Assembly election: Peravurani
Party	Candidate	Votes	%	±%
AIADMK	M. R. Govindan	52,690	55.46%	−3.1
CPI	A. M. Gopu	25,423	26.76%	New
Independent	Kuzha Chellaiah	12,183	12.82%	New
Independent	R. Gunasekaran	3,685	3.88%	New
Margin of victory		27,267	28.70%	11.58%
Turnout		94,998	84.03%	−0.23%
Registered electors		121,151		
AIADMK hold		Swing	-3.10%	

=== 1980 ===
1980 Tamil Nadu Legislative Assembly election: Peravurani
Party	Candidate	Votes	%	±%
AIADMK	M. R. Govindan	56,010	58.56%	+19.77
INC	A. Palanivel	39,633	41.44%	New
Margin of victory		16,377	17.12%	7.67%
Turnout		95,643	84.26%	7.09%
Registered electors		115,008		
AIADMK hold		Swing	19.77%	

=== 1977 ===
1977 Tamil Nadu Legislative Assembly election: Peravurani
Party	Candidate	Votes	%	±%
AIADMK	M. R. Govindan	32,625	38.80%	New
CPI	M. Masilamani	24,675	29.34%	New
DMK	R. Vedachalam	21,901	26.04%	−8.12
JP	T. R. Nagarathinam	4,894	5.82%	New
Margin of victory		7,950	9.45%	7.15%
Turnout		84,095	77.17%	−8.61%
Registered electors		110,000		
AIADMK gain from Independent		Swing	2.33%	

=== 1971 ===
1971 Tamil Nadu Legislative Assembly election: Peravurani
Party	Candidate	Votes	%	±%
Independent	Kuzha. Chelliah	32,025	36.46%	New
DMK	M. Krishnamoorthy	30,005	34.16%	−11.24
INC	A. Palanivelu	21,850	24.88%	−8.87
Independent	S. Chellaiah	3,729	4.25%	New
Margin of victory		2,020	2.30%	−9.36%
Turnout		87,832	85.78%	−1.79%
Registered electors		107,265		
Independent gain from DMK		Swing	-8.94%	

=== 1967 ===
1967 Madras Legislative Assembly election: Peravurani
Party	Candidate	Votes	%	±%
DMK	M. Krishnamurthy	35,505	45.40%	New
INC	A. V. Servai	26,387	33.74%	New
CPI	M. Masilamani	15,792	20.19%	New
Independent	I. Arukandu	515	0.66%	New
Margin of victory		9,118	11.66%	
Turnout		78,199	87.56%	
Registered electors		93,341		
DMK win (new seat)				
