= Kolathur, Tamil Nadu Assembly constituency =

Coordinates: 11.51°N 77.45°E

Kolathur, Pudukkottai
- Former constituency for the Tamil Nadu Legislative Assembly

Constituency details
- Country: India
- Region: South India
- State: Tamil Nadu
- District: Pudukkottai
- Lok Sabha constituency: PudukkottaI
- Established: 1977
- Abolished: 2008
- Total electors: 1,97,012

Kolathur, கொளத்தூர் (புதுக்கோட்டை) (சட்டமன்றத் தொகுதி - 190) was former state assembly constituency in Tamil Nadu. Formed in the year 1977, it was a part of Pudukkottai Lok Sabha constituency until the Delimitation of Constituencies, 2008. In the 2006 Assembly election, it had a total of 1,97,012 voters out of which 97,346 were male and 99,666 were female voters. After the delimitation, Kolathur (SC) was dissolved and its territories were shared between the newly formed Gandarvakottai and Viralimalai constituencies.

== Members of the Legislative Assembly ==
Election	Member	Party
1977	V. Chinnaiah	Indian National Congress
1980	T. Marimuthu	All India Anna Dravida Munnetra Kazhagam
1984	T. Marimuthu	All India Anna Dravida Munnetra Kazhagam
1989	V. Raju	All India Anna Dravida Munnetra Kazhagam
1991	C. Kulandai Velu	All India Anna Dravida Munnetra Kazhagam
1996	Selvaraj @ Kavithai Pithan	Dravida Munnetra Kazhagam
2001	Dr. A. Karuppayee	All India Anna Dravida Munnetra Kazhagam
2006	N. Subramanian	All India Anna Dravida Munnetra Kazhagam

== Election results ==
Vote share of winning candidates
2006	46.41%
2001	61.98%
1996	54.88%
1991	76.51%
1989	39.98%
1984	62.72%
1980	57.25%
1977	36.55%

=== Assembly election 2006 ===
2006 Tamil Nadu Legislative Assembly election : Kolathur
Party	Candidate	Votes	%	±%
AIADMK	N. Subramanian	68,735	46.41%	New
DMK	C. Paranjothi	62,467	42.18%	New
DMDK	M. Udayakumar	7,990	5.40%	New
BJP	N. Velusamy	4,827	3.26%	New
Independent	P. Murugesan	2,304	1.56%	New
Independent	A. Palanivelu	1,082	0.73%	New
Margin of victory		6,268	4.23%	▼31.72
Turnout		148,095	75.17%	▲12.95
Total valid votes		148,090		
Registered electors		197,012		▼6.06
AIADMK gain from AIADMK		Swing	▼15.57	

=== Assembly election 2001 ===
2001 Tamil Nadu Legislative Assembly election : Kolathur
Party	Candidate	Votes	%	±%
AIADMK	Dr. A. Karuppayee	80,855	61.98%	▲25.33
PT	M. Palaniappan Alias Purachi Kavidasan	33,956	26.03%	New
MDMK	A. Mookaiah Alias Nilavudasan	9,764	7.48%	▲2.04
Independent	C. Thangavelu	3,313	2.54%	New
Independent	K. Sivagnanam	2,572	1.97%	New
Margin of victory		46,899	35.95%	▲17.72
Turnout		130,487	62.22%	▼10.81
Total valid votes		130,460		
Registered electors		209,726		▲9.51
AIADMK gain from DMK		Swing	▲7.10	

=== Assembly election 1996 ===
1996 Tamil Nadu Legislative Assembly election : Kolathur
Party	Candidate	Votes	%	±%
DMK	Selvaraj @ Kavithai Pithan	72,706	54.88%	New
AIADMK	A. Karuppayee	48,550	36.65%	New
MDMK	R. Gunasekaran	7,209	5.44%	New
AIIC(T)	C. Mathimaran	1,831	1.38%	New
Margin of victory		24,156	18.23%	▼36.48
Turnout		139,868	73.03%	▲2.04
Total valid votes		132,474		
Registered electors		191,515		▲9.47
DMK gain from AIADMK		Swing	▼21.63	

=== Assembly election 1991 ===
1991 Tamil Nadu Legislative Assembly election : Kolathur
Party	Candidate	Votes	%	±%
AIADMK	C. Kulandai Velu	91,350	76.51%	New
Thayaga Marumalarchi Kazhagam	V. Raju	26,038	21.81%	New
THMM	M. Selvaraj	741	0.62%	New
Margin of victory		65,312	54.71%	▲44.46
Turnout		124,191	70.99%	▼7.13
Total valid votes		119,389		
Registered electors		174,949		▲12.25
AIADMK gain from AIADMK		Swing	▲36.53	

=== Assembly election 1989 ===
1989 Tamil Nadu Legislative Assembly election : Kolathur
Party	Candidate	Votes	%	±%
AIADMK	V. Raju	47,624	39.98%	New
DMK	Selvaraj @ Kavithai Pithan	35,419	29.73%	▼5.00
Independent	I. Sivananthan	19,027	15.97%	New
AIADMK	P. Jambulingam	15,539	13.04%	New
Independent	R. S. Elavan	1,011	0.85%	New
Margin of victory		12,205	10.25%	▼17.74
Turnout		121,751	78.12%	▼1.20
Total valid votes		119,125		
Registered electors		155,855		▲16.01
AIADMK gain from AIADMK		Swing	▼22.74	

=== Assembly election 1984 ===
1984 Tamil Nadu Legislative Assembly election : Kolathur
Party	Candidate	Votes	%	±%
AIADMK	T. Marimuthu	62,391	62.72%	▲5.47
DMK	Keerai A. Thamizhselvan	34,544	34.73%	▼7.18
Independent	N. Marudhan	1,986	2.00%	New
Margin of victory		27,847	27.99%	▲12.66
Turnout		106,558	79.32%	▲8.76
Total valid votes		99,472		
Registered electors		134,345		▲5.48
AIADMK hold		Swing	▲5.47	

=== Assembly election 1980 ===
1980 Tamil Nadu Legislative Assembly election : Kolathur
Party	Candidate	Votes	%	±%
AIADMK	T. Marimuthu	50,810	57.25%	New
DMK	Keerai A. Thamizhselvan	37,200	41.91%	▲19.69
Margin of victory		13,610	15.33%	▲9.63
Turnout		89,868	70.56%	▲8.44
Total valid votes		88,754		
Registered electors		127,362		▲5.53
AIADMK gain from INC		Swing	▲20.70	

=== Assembly election 1977 ===
1977 Tamil Nadu Legislative Assembly election : Kolathur
Party	Candidate	Votes	%	±%
INC	V. Chinnaiah	27,071	36.55%	New
AIADMK	T. Marimuthu	22,853	30.86%	New
DMK	Keerai A. Thamizhselvan	16,459	22.22%	New
JP	C. Sundaravelu	4,722	6.38%	New
Independent	C. Mathimaran	2,957	3.99%	New
Margin of victory		4,218	5.70%	
Turnout		74,965	62.12%	
Total valid votes		74,062		
Registered electors		120,684		
INC win (new seat)				
