= Rajah Serfoji Government College =

College in Tamil Nadu, India

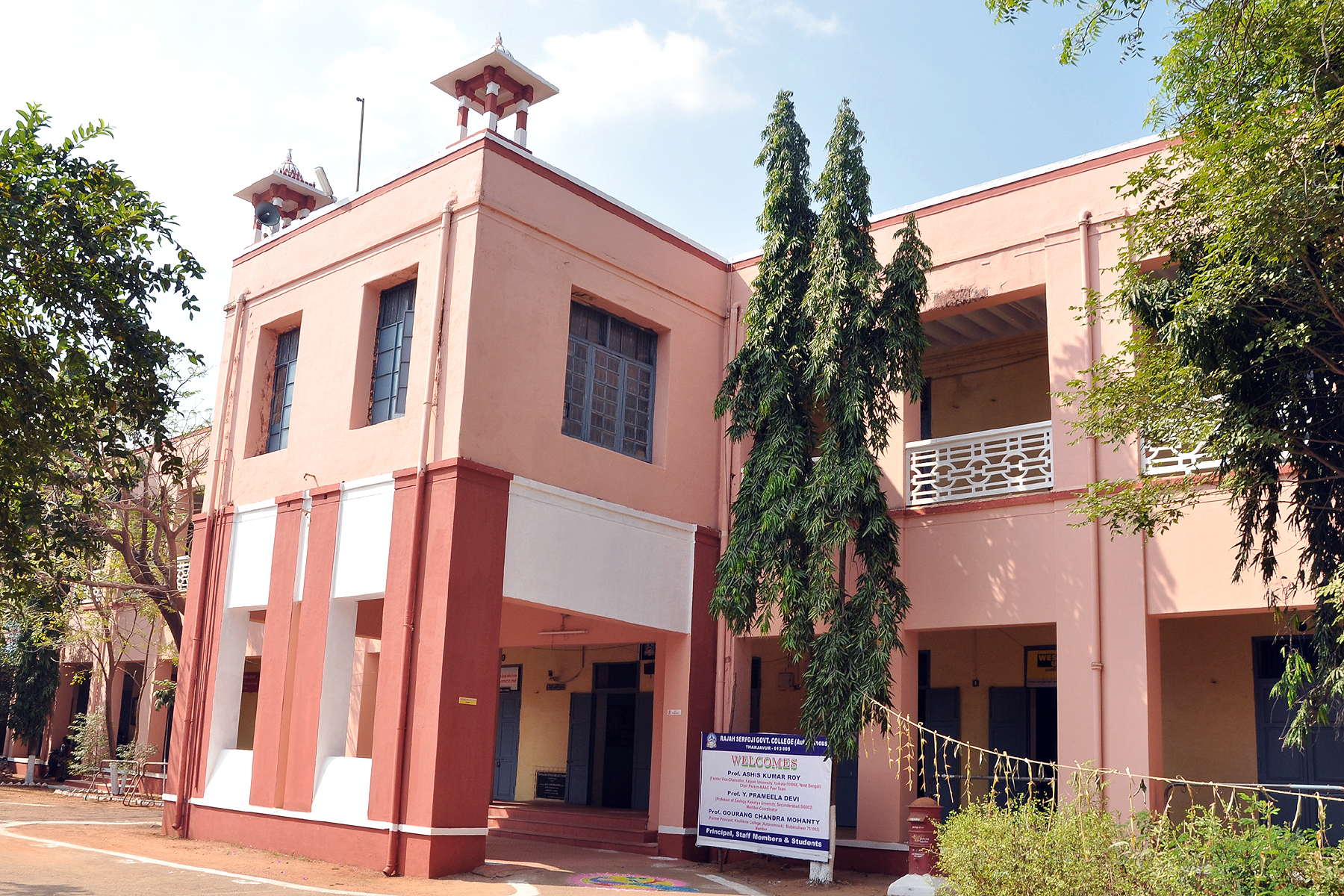
- Motto: Knowledge is seeking the true substance (மெய்ப்பொருள் காண்பது அறிவு)
- Type: Public, Autonomous, Government
- Established: 1955; 71 years ago
- Affiliations: Bharathidasan University
- Principal: M. Sumathi
- Academic staff: 136
- Students: 3500+
- Location: Thanjavur, Tamil Nadu, India
- Campus: Thanjavur
- Website: rsgc.ac.in

Rajah Serfoji Government College is a government arts and science college located in Thanjavur, Tamil Nadu, India. The college was recognized and provided autonomous status by the University Grants Commission. The college was established on 23 June 1955 at Palace Comple of Thanjavur city. Currently, it functions as an autonomous college affiliated with Bharathidasan University, Tiruchirappalli. It has been accredited with an 'A' grade (3.18/4) by the National Assessment and Accreditation Council (NAAC) in the fourth cycle of accreditation which was held on 2024.

== Courses offered ==
=== Undergraduate courses ===
==== Arts ====
- Tamil Literature
- English

==== Commerce ====
- Commerce
- Economics
- Business Administration

==== Science ====
- Physics (Tamil & English Medium)
- Chemistry (Tamil & English Medium)
- Mathematics (Tamil & English Medium)
- Zoology (Tamil & English Medium)
- Computer Science (English Medium)
- Statistics (English Medium)
- Biochemistry (English Medium only)
- Biotechnology (English Medium only)

=== Postgraduate courses ===
==== Arts ====
- Tamil
- English

==== Commerce ====
- Commerce
- Economics

==== Science ====
- Physics
- Chemistry
- Mathematics
- Zoology
- Computer Science
- Statistics
- Biochemistry

=== Research programs ===
Ph.D. (Part-time / Full-time)

==== Arts ====
- Tamil
- English

==== Commerce ====
- Commerce
- Economics
- Management

==== Science ====
- Physics
- Chemistry
- Mathematics
- Zoology
- Computer Science
- Biochemistry

== National Institutional Ranking Framework ==
Rajah Serfoji Government College (Autonomous), Thanjavur secured the 79th position among colleges in India in the National Institutional Ranking Framework (NIRF) for the year 2025. The college take active participation in the NIRF rankings since 2019.

== Notable alumni ==
- M. Sankaran - Indian Space Scientist
- Pushpavanam Kuppusamy - Folk Singer
- Durai Chandrasekaran - Member of the Legislative Assembly, Thiruvaiyaru
- A. Kaliyamoorthy - Indian Police Service (IPS) Officer
- S. Murasoli - Member of Parliament, Lok Sabha
- M. Subramanian - Former Member of the Legislative Assembly, Thiruvaiyaru
- N. Sivagnanam - Former Member of the Legislative Assembly, Thiruvonam
- M. Ramachandran - Former Member of the Legislative Assembly
- S. Thangarasu - Former Member of Parliament, Lok Sabha, Perambalur

== Notable faculty members ==
- K. Rathnam
- Avvai Natarajan
- A. Chinnasamy
