= S. Murasoli =

DMK politician and Member of Indian Parliament

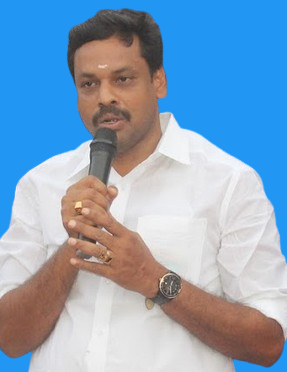

Member of Parliament, Lok Sabha
- Incumbent
- Assumed office June 2024
- Preceded by: S. S. Palanimanickam
- Constituency: Thanjavur

Personal details
- Born: Thanjavur, Tamil Nadu
- Party: Dravida Munnetra Kazhagam
- Spouse: Porselvi
- Children: M. Athavan (son)
- Education: B. Sc. (Rajah Serfoji Government College), Thanjavur; L.L.B. (Dr. Ram Manohar Lohia College of Law, Bangaluru)
- As of 5 June, 2024

Shanmugasundaram Murasoli (in Tamil: ச. முரசொலி) is an Indian politician and Member of Parliament of India from Tamil Nadu. He belongs to Dravida Munnetra Kazhagam.

== Early life and education ==
Murasoli was born in Thennankudi, Thanjavur district, Tamil Nadu. His father is K. Shanmugasundaram Nattar and mother is Dharmasamvarthini. Shanmugasundaram worked as the President of Tennankudi Panchayat Council in the year 1971. Murasoli did his bachelor's degree from Rajah Serfoji Government College, Thanjavur. He also completed bachelor's degree in law from Dr. Ram Manohar Lohia College of Law, Bangaluru.

== Politics ==
Murasoli is an active cadre of DMK and worked as the party secretary of Thanjavur DMK North Union. In the 2024 Indian General Election he contested in the Thanjavur Lok Sabha constituency in the DMK ticket. He won the election by getting 502245 and became a member of the Lok Sabha, Parliament of India.

== See also ==
- Thanjavur Lok Sabha constituency
- Rajah Serfoji Government College
