= S. Singaravadivel =

Indian politician

Sivanandam Singravadivel Saluvar was an Indian politician.

He was elected to the Lok Sabha from Thanjavur constituency as an Indian National Congress candidate in the bye-election in Tamil Nadu 1979, and the 1980, 1984 and 1989 elections.

He died on 31 January 2022 due to COVID-19 during the COVID-19 pandemic in India.
