= Mannargudi Assembly constituency =

One of the 234 State Legislative Assembly Constituencies in Tamil Nadu, in India

Coordinates: 10.663°N 79.445°E

Mannargudi
- Constituency No. 167 for the Tamil Nadu Legislative Assembly

Constituency details
- Country: India
- Region: South India
- State: Tamil Nadu
- District: Tiruvarur
- Lok Sabha constituency: Thanjavur
- Established: 1951
- Total electors: 234,554
- Reservation: None

Member of Legislative Assembly
- 17th Tamil Nadu Legislative Assembly
- Incumbent S. Kamaraj
- Party: IND (Note: Expelled from AMMK)
- Alliance: TVK+
- Elected year: 2026

Mannargudi is a legislative assembly constituency in Thiruvarur district in the Indian state of Tamil Nadu. It is one of the 234 State Legislative Assembly Constituencies in Tamil Nadu, in India.

Elections and winners from this constituency are listed below.

== Members of Legislative Assembly ==
Year	Member	Political party
Madras State
1952	Manali C. Kandasami	Communist Party of India
1957	T. S. Swaminatha Odayar	Indian National Congress
1962	T. S. Swaminatha Odayar	Indian National Congress
1967	T. S. Swaminatha Odayar	Indian National Congress
Tamil Nadu
1971	K. Balakrishnan	Dravida Munnetra Kazhagam
1977	M. Ambigapathi	Communist Party of India
1980	M. Ambigapathi	Communist Party of India
1984	S. Gnanasundaram	All India Anna Dravida Munnetra Kazhagam
1989	K. Ramachandran	Dravida Munnetra Kazhagam
1991	K. Srinivasan	All India Anna Dravida Munnetra Kazhagam
1996	V. Sivapunniam	Communist Party of India
2001	V. Sivapunniam	Communist Party of India
2006	V. Sivapunniam	Communist Party of India
2011	T. R. B. Rajaa	Dravida Munnetra Kazhagam
2016	T. R. B. Rajaa	Dravida Munnetra Kazhagam
2021	T. R. B. Rajaa	Dravida Munnetra Kazhagam
2026	S. Kamaraj	Amma Makkal Munnetra Kazhagam

== Election results ==
Vote share of winning candidates
2026	35.25%
2021	45.34%
2016	48.71%
2011	48.93%
2006	49.42%
2001	56.40%
1996	59.80%
1991	52.32%
1989	43.10%
1984	47.96%
1980	56.33%
1977	37.89%
1971	52.05%
1967	50.10%
1962	51.94%
1957	44.60%
1952	25.49%

=== 2026 ===
2026 Tamil Nadu Legislative Assembly election: Mannargudi
Party	Candidate	Votes	%	±%
AMMK	S. Kamaraj	68,416	35.25	▲14.20
DMK	T. R. B. Rajaa	66,850	34.44	▼10.90
TVK	U. V. M. Rajarajan	44,266	22.81	New
NTK	R. Bharathiselvan	8,240	4.25	▼1.18
AIPTMMK	S. Rasupillai	1,949	1.00	New
NOTA	None of the above	405	0.21	▼0.29
Margin of victory		1,566	0.81	▼18.64
Turnout		1,94,100	82.75	▲8.81
Registered electors		2,34,554		▼25,488
AMMK gain from DMK		Swing	▲14.20	

=== 2021 ===
2021 Tamil Nadu Legislative Assembly election: Mannargudi
Party	Candidate	Votes	%	±%
DMK	T. R. B. Rajaa	87,172	45.34	−3.37
AIADMK	Siva Rajamanickam	49,779	25.89	−17.51
AMMK	S. Kamaraj	40,481	21.05	New
NTK	Aravindan Rama	10,438	5.43	+4.4
Independent	T. Kumaresan	1,845	0.96	New
MNM	S. Anbanandam	1,366	0.71	New
NOTA	NOTA	960	0.50	−0.45
Margin of victory		37,393	19.45	14.14
Turnout		192,269	73.94	−3.56
Rejected ballots		356	0.19	
Registered electors		260,042		
DMK hold		Swing	-3.37	

=== 2016 ===
2016 Tamil Nadu Legislative Assembly election: Mannargudi
Party	Candidate	Votes	%	±%
DMK	T. R. B. Rajaa	91,137	48.71	−0.23
AIADMK	S. Kamaraj	81,200	43.40	−3.14
DMDK	A. Murugaiyan Babu	5,966	3.19	New
PMK	S. Balasubramaniyan	1,983	1.06	New
NTK	E. Balamurugan	1,923	1.03	New
NOTA	NOTA	1,774	0.95	New
BJP	B. Sivakumar	1,744	0.93	+0.07
Margin of victory		9,937	5.31	2.91
Turnout		187,110	77.49	−3.37
Registered electors		241,448		
DMK hold		Swing	-0.23	

=== 2011 ===
2011 Tamil Nadu Legislative Assembly election: Mannargudi
Party	Candidate	Votes	%	±%
DMK	T. R. B. Rajaa	81,320	48.93	New
AIADMK	Siva. Rajamanickam	77,338	46.54	+2.17
Independent	M. Jayachandran	1,863	1.12	New
BJP	P. Vasudevan	1,435	0.86	−0.51
Independent	K. Vetrivel	924	0.56	New
Margin of victory		3,982	2.40	−2.65
Turnout		205,522	80.86	5.71
Registered electors		166,186		
DMK gain from CPI		Swing	-0.48	

=== 2006 ===
2006 Tamil Nadu Legislative Assembly election: Mannargudi
Party	Candidate	Votes	%	±%
CPI	V. Sivapunniam	68,144	49.42	−6.98
AIADMK	R. Kamaraj	61,186	44.37	New
DMDK	N. Muthiya	4,500	3.26	New
BJP	K. Kalayana Raman	1,894	1.37	−38.91
Independent	V. Muthu Lingam	836	0.61	New
Margin of victory		6,958	5.05	−11.07
Turnout		137,898	75.15	7.80
Registered electors		183,489		
CPI hold		Swing	-6.98	

=== 2001 ===
2001 Tamil Nadu Legislative Assembly election: Mannargudi
Party	Candidate	Votes	%	±%
CPI	V. Sivapunniam	70,644	56.40	−3.4
BJP	S. Gnanasekaran	50,454	40.28	New
Independent	V. Neduncheyan	1,722	1.37	New
Independent	R. Senguttuvan Vandaiyur	1,467	1.17	New
Independent	R. V. Kaliamurthy	969	0.77	New
Margin of victory		20,190	16.12	−17.06
Turnout		125,256	67.35	−5.92
Registered electors		185,994		
CPI hold		Swing	-3.40	

=== 1996 ===
1996 Tamil Nadu Legislative Assembly election: Mannargudi
Party	Candidate	Votes	%	±%
CPI	V. Sivapunniam	71,803	59.80	+14.13
AIADMK	K. Kaliyaperumal	31,969	26.62	−25.69
MDMK	P. Tamilarasan	14,582	12.14	New
PMK	R. Dhanalakshmi	875	0.73	New
Margin of victory		39,834	33.17	26.52
Turnout		120,076	73.27	1.61
Registered electors		170,116		
CPI gain from AIADMK		Swing	7.48	

=== 1991 ===
1991 Tamil Nadu Legislative Assembly election: Mannargudi
Party	Candidate	Votes	%	±%
AIADMK	K. Srinivasan	58,194	52.32	+43.07
CPI	V. Veerasenan	50,798	45.67	+4.98
PMK	T. Vaduganathan	1,258	1.13	New
Margin of victory		7,396	6.65	4.24
Turnout		111,232	71.66	−7.64
Registered electors		159,854		
AIADMK gain from DMK		Swing	9.22	

=== 1989 ===
1989 Tamil Nadu Legislative Assembly election: Mannargudi
Party	Candidate	Votes	%	±%
DMK	K. Ramachandran	48,809	43.10	New
CPI	V. Veerasenan	46,084	40.69	−2.98
AIADMK	S. Gnana Sundaram	10,478	9.25	−38.71
Independent	M. Ambigapathy	6,482	5.72	New
Independent	V. A. M. Amaan Khan	879	0.78	New
Margin of victory		2,725	2.41	−1.89
Turnout		113,259	79.29	−1.77
Registered electors		144,950		
DMK gain from AIADMK		Swing	-4.87	

=== 1984 ===
1984 Tamil Nadu Legislative Assembly election: Mannargudi
Party	Candidate	Votes	%	±%
AIADMK	S. Gnanasundaram	49,471	47.96	New
CPI	P. Ramalingam	45,044	43.67	−12.66
INC(J)	S. Ganesekaran	8,079	7.83	New
Independent	A. Parthibhan	553	0.54	New
Margin of victory		4,427	4.29	−15.62
Turnout		103,147	81.06	4.44
Registered electors		131,490		
AIADMK gain from CPI		Swing	-8.36	

=== 1980 ===
1980 Tamil Nadu Legislative Assembly election: Mannargudi
Party	Candidate	Votes	%	±%
CPI	M. Ambigapathi	51,818	56.33	+18.43
INC	M. Gopalasamy Thenkondar	33,496	36.41	New
Independent	K. Kunchithapatham	5,895	6.41	New
JP	P. Veeraiya Thevar	787	0.86	New
Margin of victory		18,322	19.92	11.72
Turnout		91,996	76.62	0.34
Registered electors		121,083		
CPI hold		Swing	18.43	

=== 1977 ===
1977 Tamil Nadu Legislative Assembly election: Mannargudi
Party	Candidate	Votes	%	±%
CPI	M. Ambigapathi	34,298	37.89	New
DMK	K. Balakrishnan	26,881	29.70	−22.35
AIADMK	A. Thirunayukkarasu	22,160	24.48	New
JP	P. Veeraiya	6,830	7.55	New
Margin of victory		7,417	8.19	−2.34
Turnout		90,515	76.28	−6.13
Registered electors		119,893		
CPI gain from DMK		Swing	-14.16	

=== 1971 ===
1971 Tamil Nadu Legislative Assembly election: Mannargudi
Party	Candidate	Votes	%	±%
DMK	K. Balakrishnan	35,211	52.05	+3.38
INC	T. S. Swaminatha Odayar	28,083	41.51	−8.58
CPI(M)	P. Venktesa Solagar	4,055	5.99	New
Margin of victory		7,128	10.54	9.11
Turnout		67,648	82.41	−2.03
Registered electors		88,422		
DMK gain from INC		Swing	1.95	

=== 1967 ===
1967 Madras Legislative Assembly election: Mannargudi
Party	Candidate	Votes	%	±%
INC	T. S. Swaminatha Odayar	32,481	50.10	−1.84
DMK	S. Narayanaswamy	31,558	48.67	+22.06
Independent	O. R. B. Thevar	797	1.23	New
Margin of victory		923	1.42	−23.90
Turnout		64,836	84.44	3.28
Registered electors		81,429		
INC hold		Swing	-1.84	

=== 1962 ===
1962 Madras Legislative Assembly election: Mannargudi
Party	Candidate	Votes	%	±%
INC	T. S. Swaminatha Odayar	37,117	51.94	+7.34
DMK	P. Narayanasami	19,021	26.62	New
CPI	R. Thangaraj	15,321	21.44	+4.2
Margin of victory		18,096	25.32	5.84
Turnout		71,459	81.17	18.66
Registered electors		91,758		
INC hold		Swing	7.34	

=== 1957 ===
1957 Madras Legislative Assembly election: Mannargudi
Party	Candidate	Votes	%	±%
INC	T. S. Swaminatha Odayar	25,095	44.60	+21.22
Independent	S. K. Sivanada Saluvar	14,135	25.12	New
CPI	P. Venkatesan	9,699	17.24	−8.25
Independent	N. Arunachalam	7,337	13.04	New
Margin of victory		10,960	19.48	17.37
Turnout		56,266	62.51	−63.29
Registered electors		90,015		
INC gain from CPI		Swing	19.11	

=== 1952 ===
1952 Madras Legislative Assembly election: Mannargudi
Party	Candidate	Votes	%	±%
CPI	M. Kandaswami	51,498	25.49	New
INC	Ramachandra Naidu	47,228	23.38	New
Socialist Party (India)	Govindaswami	9,521	4.71	New
Independent	Kulandavelu Nainar	7,189	3.56	New
Margin of victory		4,270	2.11	
Turnout		202,039	125.79	
Registered electors		160,613		
CPI win (new seat)				
