= T. S. Swaminatha Odayar =

Indian politician

T. S. Swaminatha Udayar was an Indian politician and former Member of the Legislative Assembly of Tamil Nadu. He was elected to the Tamil Nadu legislative assembly as an Indian National Congress candidate from Mannargudi constituency in 1957, 1962 and 1967 elections.
