= M. Sankaran =

Indian space researcher

- Born: 8 August 1964 (age 62); Enkan, Thiruvarur, Tamil Nadu, India
- Education: Thanthai Periyar Government College of Arts and Sciences; Rajah Serfoji Government College, Thanjavur
- Occupations: Director, scientist
- Years active: 1986–present
- Employer: U R Rao Satellite Centre (ISRO)

M. Sankaran is a scientist at the Indian Space Research Organization. He is headquartered in Bangalore as the director of the U R Rao Satellite Centre. Sankaran is one among them on July 14, 2023, when ISRO successfully landed Chandrayaan-3 on moon.

== Education ==
Sankaran was born on August 8, 1964, in Thanjavur, Thanjavur district, Tamil Nadu. His father is Muthuswamy. Mother is Mythily. As his father worked in the Indian Railways, Sankaran did his schooling in several schools in Tamil Nadu like Vrudhachalam, Villupuram and Thanjavur. He completed his undergraduate course in physics at Thanthai Periyar Government College of Arts and Sciences, Tiruchirappalli (formerly Periyar E.V.R. College). He had completed M.Sc. Physics at Rajah Serfoji Government College, Thanjavur in 1985. Sankaran is an expert in a wide range of fields, including spacecraft power systems elements, navigation, communications, remote sensing, meteorology and interplanetary exploration.

== In ISRO ==
After completion of M.Sc. in Physics Sankaran joined ISRO in the year 1986. His field of research/work included managing diverse projects such as Satellite Positioning Systems. Sankaran is an expert in Radio Frequency Communication Systems, Geostationary satellites, Navigation Satellites, and Outer Space Missions like Chandrayaan 1, 2, & 3. He is also expert in the miniaturization of avionics systems, indigenization of electronics and power system components. He is also involved in the Gaganyaan program. Sankaran was appointed as director of U R Rao Satellite Centre in 2021 and since then he made significant contributions to various sectors of the Chandrayaan 3 mission and Gaganyaan program. He superannuated on 31st August 2026

== See also ==
- ISRO
- Rajah Serfoji Government College
