= K. Muthuswamy Vallatharasu =

Indian lawyer, politician, and participant in the Indian independence movement

Member of Parliament, Lok Sabha
- In office 1952–1957
- Succeeded by: R Ramanathan Chettiar
- Constituency: Pudukkottai

Personal details
- Born: 12 June 1901
- Died: 30 July 1968 (aged 67)
- Party: Indian National Congress; Praja Socialist Party
- Education: H. H. The Rajah's College, Pudukkottai; St. Joseph's College, Tiruchirappalli; Government Law College, Thiruvananthapuram

Koppampatti Muthuswamy Vallatharasu (12 June 1901 – 30 July 1968) was an Indian lawyer, politician, and participant in the Indian independence movement. He was associated with social reform initiatives and served as a member of parliament from Tamil Nadu.

== Early life and education ==
Muthuswamy Vallatharasu was born on 12 June 1901 in Koppampatti in the Pudukkottai region of present-day Tamil Nadu (then part of the Madras Presidency). He pursued education at H. H. The Rajah's College in Pudukkottai, St. Joseph's College in Tiruchirappalli, and the Government Law College in Thiruvananthapuram, eventually qualifying as a lawyer. Muthuswamy Vallatharasu married Shrimati Thilakavathi Ammal on 11 September 1947. The couple had two sons and two daughters.

== Social and political activism ==
Vallatharasu supported several social reform initiatives, including widow remarriage, inter-caste marriage, and the promotion of marriage ceremonies without Vedic rituals. He was a co-founder of the "Erode Samadharma Project" in 1933, alongside figures like Singaravelar, Periyar, and Jeeva, which aimed to promote social equality. Vallatharasu joined the Indian National Congress in the mid-1930s and rose to prominence as a leader in his region. In 1936, he was elected as a member of the local municipality, where he served for four years. During the Quit India Movement in 1942, Vallatharasu participated in an effort to demolish the Ramanathapuram-Thirumayam Jail, leading to the release of Chinna Annamalai, a fellow activist. For this action, he was imprisoned for two and a half years, serving time in Thanjavur and Vellore jails.

Following India's independence, Vallatharasu supported the integration of the princely state of Pudukkottai into the Indian Union. In 1952 Indian general election, he contested and won from Pudukkottai constituency as a candidate for the Kisan Mazdoor Praja Party (later merged into Praja Socialist Party) after being denied a ticket by the Indian National Congress. In 1957 Indian general election, he contested from 2 constituencies - Pudukkottai and Thanjavur and came second in both of them. He contested 1962 Indian general election from Thanjavur and lost.

== Death ==
Muthuswamy Vallatharasu died on 30 July 1968.
