= T. R. B. Rajaa =

Indian politician

Dr. T. R. B. Rajaa
- முனைவர். டி. ஆர். பி. ராஜா
- Rajaa at DMK Cadre Committee Meeting, 2025.

Cabinet Minister Government of Tamil Nadu
- In office 11 May 2023 – 5 May 2026
- Minister: Department of Industries (Tamil Nadu)
- Chief Minister: M. K. Stalin
- Preceded by: Thangam Thennarasu
- Succeeded by: S. Keerthana

Secretary of the DMK IT wing
- Incumbent
- Assumed office 18 January 2022
- President: M. K. Stalin
- Preceded by: Palanivel Thiagarajan

Member of Tamil Nadu Legislative Assembly
- In office 13 May 2011 – 5 May 2026
- Preceded by: V. Sivapunniyam
- Succeeded by: S. Kamaraj
- Constituency: Mannargudi

Personal details
- Born: Senthilkumaar Baalu; 12 July 1976 (age 50) Madras, Tamil Nadu, India (Now Chennai)
- Party: Dravida Munnetra Kazhagam
- Spouse: Sharmila J Rajaa (m. 2005)
- Children: 2
- Parents: T. R. Baalu (father); Renuka Devi Baalu (mother)
- Education: MCC School, Loyola College, University of Dublin, University of Madras, Vels University

Thalikkottai Rajuthevar Baalu Rajaa, better known as Dr. T. R. B. Rajaa is an Indian Tamil politician. He was the Minister for Industries, Investment Promotions and Commerce in the Government of Tamil Nadu since 2023, having won the 2011, 2016 and the 2021 Tamil Nadu Legislative Assembly Elections representing DMK in Mannargudi. He also holds the position of the party's IT Wing Secretary.

== Education ==
He did his schooling at Madras Christian College Higher Secondary School. He graduated from the University of Madras with a Masters in Psychology. He successfully defended his research thesis and was awarded a Doctorate in Philosophy (PhD) in Counselling Psychology and Management (Inter-Disciplinary) from Vels University.

== Personal life ==
Rajaa was born on 12 July 1976 in Chennai to T.R.Baalu and Renuka Devi. During his birth, his father was serving his term under the MISA Act. Renuka recalls showing the new born to her husband in Madras Central Prison from a bridge nearby.

He is married to Sharmila, the daughter of Educationist Leo Muthu in April 2005. The couple has a Son and a Daughter. Both of them are National and International Level Sports Trap Shooters respectively.

== Political career ==
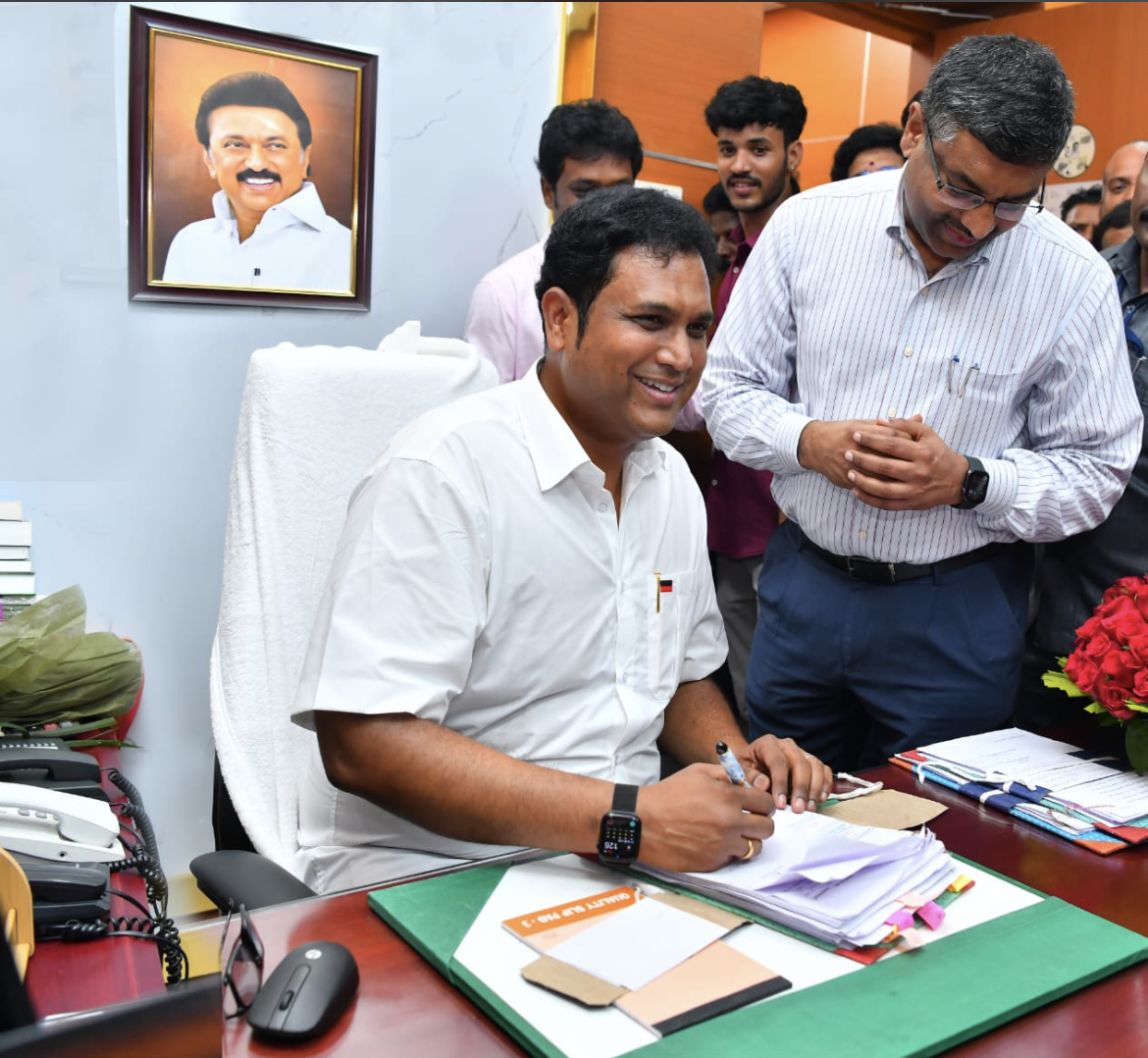
Rajaa assuming the office of Minister for Industries, Investment Promotions and Commerce in Government of Tamil Nadu

Rajaa has been elected thrice to the Tamil Nadu Legislative Assembly from Mannargudi. He was appointed the first secretary of the DMK's NRI Wing in 2021 and then as second Secretary of the DMK's IT Wing after former secretary PTR, had resigned from the post in 2022. After DMK came back to power in 2021, Rajaa was appointed a member in the Tamil Nadu State Planning Commission and as the Chairman of the Legislative Committee on Estimates by the CM Thiru. M K Stalin.

T.R.B.Rajaa was sworn-in as the Minister for Industries and Investment Promotions and Commerce in the Tamil Nadu Cabinet on 11 May 2023.

He contested 2026 Tamil Nadu Legislative Assembly election in Mannarkudi Assembly constituency as Dravida Munnetra Kazhagam candidate and lost the election to Amma Makkal Munnetra Kazhagam party candidate.

== Offices held/holding ==
- Secretary of DMK IT Wing: 2022–present
- Member of DMK Executive Committee: 2023–present
- MLA from Mannargudi: May 2011– May 2026
- Minister for Industries, Investment Promotions and Commerce in Government of Tamil Nadu: 11 May 2023- 4 May 2026
- Member of DMK Elections Manifesto Committee: For the 2024 Election
- Substitute Speaker of the TN Legislative Assembly: 2021–2023
- Member of Tamil Nadu State Planning Commission: 2021–2023
- Chairman of TN Legislative Estimates Committee: 2021–2023
- Secretary of DMK NRI Wing: 2021–2022
- Member of TN Public Accounts Committee: 2012–13; 2019–21; 2021-2023 (as ex-officio)
- Senate Member of Tamil University: 2019-2021
- Member of TN Public Undertakings Committee: 2012-13; 2015–16
- Member of TN Estimates Committee: 2011-12; 2014–15; 2021-2023 (as Chairman)
- Senate Member of Madras University: 2011-13
- Chairman of Kings College of Engineering-Pudukkottai: 2003-10

== Elections contested ==
Tamil Nadu Legislative Assembly Elections:

Election	Constituency	Party	Result	Vote %	Opposition Candidate	Opposition Party	Opposition vote %
2026 Tamil Nadu Legislative Assembly election	Mannargudi	DMK	Lost	34.44%	S. Kamaraj	AMMK	35.25%
2021 Tamil Nadu Legislative Assembly election	Mannargudi	DMK	Won	45.34%	Siva. Rajamanickam	AIADMK	25.89%
2016 Tamil Nadu Legislative Assembly election	Mannargudi	DMK	Won	48.71%	S. Kamaraj	AIADMK	43.40%
2011 Tamil Nadu Legislative Assembly election	Mannargudi	DMK	Won	48.93%	Siva. Rajamanickam	AIADMK	46.54%
