= West Tambaram =

Coordinates: 12°56′09″N 80°04′34″E

West Tambaram is a locality in Tambaram Tamil Nadu, India, located in the Chennai metropolitan area. It is one of the main commercial and residential areas of the metropolitan region. Its main features include shopping centres, several colleges, schools, banks and public libraries. Shanmugam Road is a main shopping street located opposite to tambaram railway station which includes wholesale grocery as well as a huge vegetable market. Tambaram Mudichur road The main road through West Tambaram connects the Chennai Neighbourhood of Lakshmi Nagar, Krishna Nagar, Bharathi Nagar, Old Perungalathur, Madhana Puram, Mullai Nagar TNHB colony and Mudichur, ending at the Vandalur - Oragadam road. West Tambaram has been growing rapidly since the development of the Vandaloor-Nemilichery Outer Ring Road.

Schools include Valluvar Gurukulam, Shri Anand Jain Vidyalaya Matriculation and Higher Secondary School. Kishkintha Theme Park is located at the intersection of Dharkast Road and the Outer Ring Road.
