= V. Sivapunniam =

Indian politician

V. Sivapunniam is an Indian politician and former Member of the Legislative Assembly of Tamil Nadu. He was elected to the Tamil Nadu legislative assembly as a Communist Party of India candidate from Mannargudi constituency in 1996, 2001 and 2006 elections.
