= Thanjavur Lok Sabha constituency =

Parliamentary constituency in Tamil Nadu, India

Coordinates: 10.8°N 79.1°E

Thanjavur
- Lok Sabha constituency
- Interactive map of Thanjavur Loksabha constituency, post-2008 delimitation

Constituency details
- Country: India
- Region: South India
- State: Tamil Nadu
- Assembly constituencies: Mannargudi; Thiruvaiyaru; Thanjavur; Orathanadu; Pattukkottai; Peravurani
- Established: 1952
- Total electors: 14,46,226 (2014)

Member of Parliament
- 18th Lok Sabha
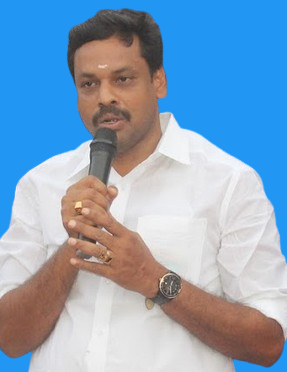
- Incumbent S. Murasoli
- Party: DMK
- Alliance: None
- Elected year: 2024

Thanjavur is a Lok Sabha (Parliament of India) constituency in Tamil Nadu. Its Tamil Nadu Parliamentary Constituency number is 30 of 39.

== Assembly segments ==
=== From 2009 ===
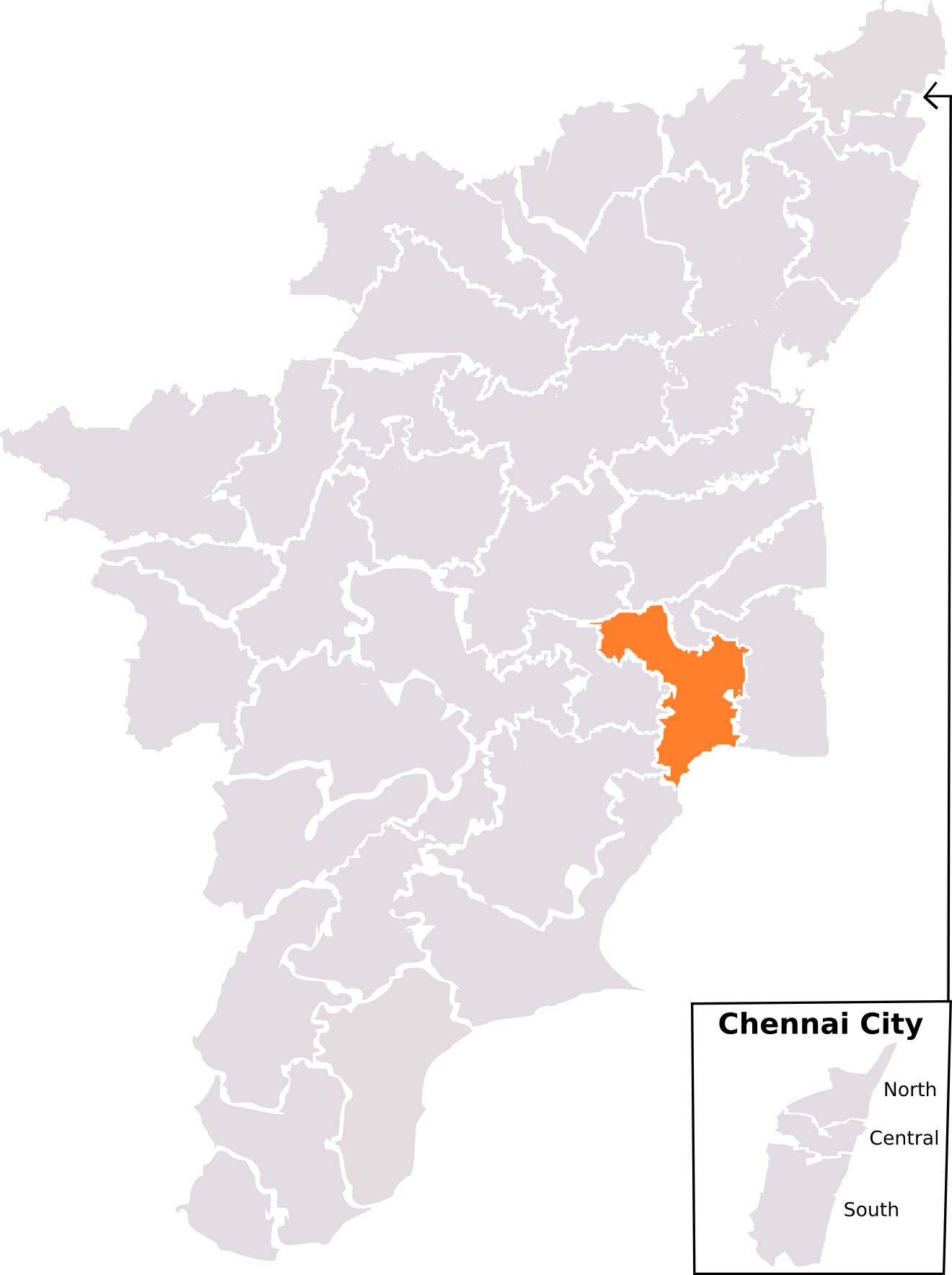
Thanjavur constituency as laid out by 2008 Delimitation

Constituency number	Name	Reserved for (SC/ST/None)	District	Party	2024 Lead
167	Mannargudi	None	Tiruvarur	IND	DMK
173	Tiruvaiyaru	None	Thanjavur	DMK	DMK
174	Thanjavur	None	Thanjavur	TVK	DMK
175	Orathanad	None	Thanjavur	DMK	DMK
176	Pattukkottai	None	Thanjavur	DMK	DMK
177	Peravurani	None	Thanjavur	DMK	DMK

=== Before 2009 ===
Thanjavur Lok Sabha constituency was previously composed of the following assembly segments:

1. Orathanad
2. Thiruvonam (defunct)
3. Thanjavur
4. Tiruvaiyaru
5. Papanasam (moved to Mayiladuthurai)
6. Valangiman (SC) (defunct)

== Members of Parliament ==
Year	Winning Candidate	Party
1952	R. Venkataraman	Indian National Congress
1957	R. Venkataraman	Indian National Congress
1957	A.Vairavan Servai	Indian National Congress
1962	V.Vairava Thevar	Indian National Congress
1967	D.S. Karthikeyan Gobalar	Dravida Munnetra Kazhagam
1971	S.D. Somasundaram Gobalar	Dravida Munnetra Kazhagam
1977	S.D. Somasundaram Gobalar	All India Anna Dravida Munnetra Kazhagam
1979(bye)	S. Singravadivel Saluvar	Indian National Congress
1980	S. Singravadivel Saluvar	Indian National Congress
1984	S. Singravadivel Saluvar	Indian National Congress
1989	S. Singravadivel Saluvar	Indian National Congress
1991	K. Thulasiah Vandayar	Indian National Congress
1996	S.S. Palanimanickam	Dravida Munnetra Kazhagam
1998	S.S. Palanimanickam	Dravida Munnetra Kazhagam
1999	S.S. Palanimanickam	Dravida Munnetra Kazhagam
2004	S.S. Palanimanickam	Dravida Munnetra Kazhagam
2009	S.S. Palanimanickam	Dravida Munnetra Kazhagam
2014	K. Parasuraman	All India Anna Dravida Munnetra Kazhagam
2019	S.S. Palanimanickam	Dravida Munnetra Kazhagam
2024	S. Murasoli	Dravida Munnetra Kazhagam

== Election results ==
Vote share of Winning candidates
2024	48.82%
2019	55.96%
2014	51.03%
2009	50.61%
2004	56.58%
1999	45.39%
1998	51.81%
1996	58.80%
1991	61.23%
1989	56.37%
1984	55.35%
1980	52.94%
1977	60.17%
1971	57.31%
1967	52.64%
1962	43.58%
1957	57.94%
1951	45.85%

=== General Elections 2024 ===
2024 Indian general election: Thanjavur
Party	Candidate	Votes	%	±%
DMK	S. Murasoli	502,245	48.82	▼7.14
DMDK	Sivanesan	1,82,662	17.76	New
BJP	M. Karuppu Muruganantham	1,70,613	16.59	New
NOTA	None of the above	12,833	1.25	▼0.19
Margin of victory		3,19,583	31.06	▼3.91
Turnout		10,28,706	68.27	▼4.28
DMK hold		Swing		

=== General Elections 2019 ===
2019 Indian general election: Thanjavur
Party	Candidate	Votes	%	±%
DMK	S. S. Palanimanickam	588,978	55.96	▲19.34
TMC(M)	N. R. Natarajan	2,20,849	20.98	
Independent	P. Murugesan	1,02,871	9.77	
Independent	R. Selvaraj	28,274	2.69	
MNM	Sampath Ramadoss	23,477	2.23	
NOTA	None of the above	15,105	1.44	▲0.21
BSP	R. Stalin	5,856	0.56	
Margin of victory		3,68,129	34.97	20.56
Turnout		10,52,570	72.55	▼2.59
Registered electors		14,61,052		9.03
DMK gain from AIADMK		Swing	4.93	

=== General Elections 2014 ===
2014 Indian general election: Thanjavur
Party	Candidate	Votes	%	±%
AIADMK	K. Parasuraman	510,307	51.03	
DMK	T. R. Baalu	3,66,188	36.62	−13.99
BJP	Karuppu Muruganantham	58,521	5.85	
INC	T. Krishnasamy Vandayar	30,232	3.02	
CPI(M)	S. Tamilselvi	23,215	2.32	
NOTA	None of the above	12,212	1.22	
Margin of victory		1,44,119	14.41	1.80
Turnout		10,00,046	75.57	−1.92
Registered electors		13,40,050		27.13
AIADMK gain from DMK		Swing	0.42	

=== General Elections 2009 ===
2009 Indian general election: Thanjavur
Party	Candidate	Votes	%	±%
DMK	S. S. Palanimanickam	408,343	50.61	−5.97
MDMK	Durai. Balakrishnan	3,06,556	37.99	
DMDK	Dr. P. Ramanathan	63,852	7.91	
Independent	D. Murugaraj	9,805	1.22	
BSP	S. Saravanan	5,811	0.72	
Margin of victory		1,01,787	12.62	−4.20
Turnout		8,06,867	76.63	7.79
Registered electors		10,54,118		2.26
DMK hold		Swing	-5.97	

=== General Elections 2004 ===
2004 Indian general election: Thanjavur
Party	Candidate	Votes	%	±%
DMK	S. S. Palanimanickam	400,986	56.58	11.19
AIADMK	K. Thangamuthu	2,81,838	39.77	−0.54
Independent	A. R. Shahul Hameed	10,606	1.50	
Independent	N. Dharamalingam	5,018	0.71	
JP	A. Venkatesan	3,947	0.56	
Margin of victory		1,19,148	16.81	11.74
Turnout		7,08,724	68.78	5.70
Registered electors		10,30,779		−1.82
DMK hold		Swing	11.19	

=== General Elections 1999 ===
1999 Indian general election: Thanjavur
Party	Candidate	Votes	%	±%
DMK	S. S. Palanimanickam	295,191	45.39	−6.42
AIADMK	K. Thangamuthu	2,62,177	40.31	
TMC(M)	Pl. A. Chidambaram	69,025	10.61	
Independent	J. Jeyabalan	12,239	1.88	
AIFB	Dr. A. Srinivasan	10,704	1.65	
Margin of victory		33,014	5.08	−2.62
Turnout		6,50,394	63.06	−9.34
Registered electors		10,49,837		3.57
DMK hold		Swing	-13.41	

=== General Elections 1998 ===
1998 Indian general election: Thanjavur
Party	Candidate	Votes	%	±%
DMK	S. S. Palanimanickam	324,344	51.81	−6.99
MDMK	L. Ganesan	2,76,140	44.11	
INC	Mathiyalagan	23,109	3.69	−24.89
Margin of victory		48,204	7.70	−22.52
Turnout		6,26,080	63.71	−8.69
Registered electors		10,13,609		4.71
DMK hold		Swing	-6.99	

=== General Elections 1996 ===
1996 Indian general election: Thanjavur
Party	Candidate	Votes	%	±%
DMK	S. S. Palanimanickam	390,010	58.80	23.55
INC	K. Thulasiah Vandayar	1,89,582	28.58	−32.65
JD	Thanjai A. Ramamurthi	40,259	6.07	
Independent	K. Sozhamannar Kanakaraja	10,948	1.65	
Independent	K. Shanmugavel	7,821	1.18	
PMK	K. M. Jackiria	7,120	1.07	−0.44
BJP	S. Arunachalam	6,015	0.91	
Margin of victory		2,00,428	30.22	4.23
Turnout		6,63,321	72.40	2.28
Registered electors		9,68,000		5.30
DMK gain from INC		Swing	-2.43	

=== General Elections 1991 ===
1991 Indian general election: Thanjavur
Party	Candidate	Votes	%	±%
INC	K. Thulasiah Vandayar	381,932	61.23	4.86
DMK	S. S. Palanimanickam	2,19,862	35.25	−6.40
PMK	H. Shahul Hameed	9,454	1.52	0.36
THMM	P. Soundararajan	3,403	0.55	
Independent	T. S. Lakshmanan	2,799	0.45	
Margin of victory		1,62,070	25.98	11.26
Turnout		6,23,774	70.12	−2.43
Registered electors		9,19,274		−0.13
INC hold		Swing	4.86	

=== General Elections 1989 ===
1989 Indian general election: Thanjavur
Party	Candidate	Votes	%	±%
INC	S. Singaravadivel	371,967	56.37	1.02
DMK	S. S. Palanimanickam	2,74,820	41.64	2.43
PMK	Kesavan Kothai	7,617	1.15	
Margin of victory		97,147	14.72	−1.42
Turnout		6,59,912	72.55	−6.91
Registered electors		9,20,496		26.89
INC hold		Swing	1.02	

=== General Elections 1984 ===
1984 Indian general election: Thanjavur
Party	Candidate	Votes	%	±%
INC	S. Singaravadivel	306,351	55.35	
DMK	S. S. Palanimanickam	2,17,030	39.21	
INC(J)	M. Subramanian	30,089	5.44	
Margin of victory		89,321	16.14	7.35
Turnout		5,53,470	79.47	1.87
Registered electors		7,25,425		9.81
INC gain from INC(I)		Swing	2.41	

=== General Elections 1980 ===
1980 Indian general election: Thanjavur
Party	Candidate	Votes	%	±%
INC(I)	S. Singaravadivel	268,382	52.94	
AIADMK	K. Thangamuthu	2,23,843	44.15	−16.02
Independent	K. Ambalapattu Subbaiyan	8,867	1.75	
INC(U)	A. Sethumadhavan	4,359	0.86	
Margin of victory		44,539	8.79	−11.56
Turnout		5,06,949	77.60	0.15
Registered electors		6,60,633		4.36
INC(I) gain from AIADMK		Swing	-7.23	

=== General Elections 1977 ===
1977 Indian general election: Thanjavur
Party	Candidate	Votes	%	±%
AIADMK	S. D. Somasundaram	289,059	60.17	
DMK	L. Ganesan	1,91,316	39.83	−17.48
Margin of victory		97,743	20.35	−0.96
Turnout		4,80,375	77.45	−3.94
Registered electors		6,33,005		6.13
AIADMK gain from DMK		Swing	2.87	

=== General Elections 1971 ===
1971 Indian general election: Thanjavur
Party	Candidate	Votes	%	±%
DMK	S. D. Somasundaram	268,980	57.31	4.67
INC(O)	R. Krishnasamy Gopalar	1,68,972	36.00	
Independent	K. M. Veeramuthu	25,425	5.42	
Independent	M. Selvam Chettiar	6,002	1.28	
Margin of victory		1,00,008	21.31	16.04
Turnout		4,69,379	81.39	−3.07
Registered electors		5,96,459		14.39
DMK hold		Swing	4.67	

=== General Elections 1967 ===
1967 Indian general election: Thanjavur
Party	Candidate	Votes	%	±%
DMK	D. S. Gopalar	225,414	52.64	
INC	R. Venkataraman	2,02,840	47.36	3.78
Margin of victory		22,574	5.27	−3.27
Turnout		4,28,254	84.46	9.21
Registered electors		5,21,430		15.06
DMK gain from INC		Swing	9.06	

=== General Elections 1962 ===
1962 Indian general election: Thanjavur
Party	Candidate	Votes	%	±%
INC	V. Vairava Thevar	143,185	43.58	−14.36
PSP	Vallatharasu	1,15,112	35.04	
SWA	S. Swayamprakasam	70,259	21.38	
Margin of victory		28,073	8.54	−7.34
Turnout		3,28,556	75.25	20.31
Registered electors		4,53,163		6.60
INC hold		Swing	-14.36	

=== General Elections 1957 ===
1957 Indian general election: Thanjavur
Party	Candidate	Votes	%	±%
INC	Ramaswamy Venkataraman	135,310	57.94	12.09
PSP	K. M. Vallatharasu	98,222	42.06	
Independent	D. Arumuga Palangoundar	0	0.00	
Margin of victory		37,088	15.88	13.40
Turnout		2,33,532	54.94	0.12
Registered electors		4,25,088		15.52
INC hold		Swing	12.09	

=== General Elections 1951 ===
1951–52 Indian general election: Thanjavur
Party	Candidate	Votes	%	±%
INC	Ramaswamy Venkataraman	92,483	45.85	45.85
Independent	R. Srinivasa Sarma	87,476	43.36	
Independent	D. D. Dasan	21,765	10.79	
Margin of victory		5,007	2.48	
Turnout		2,01,724	54.82	
Registered electors		3,67,963		0.00
INC win (new seat)				

== See also ==
- Thanjavur
- List of constituencies of the Lok Sabha
