= T. R. Baalu =

Indian politician (born 1941)

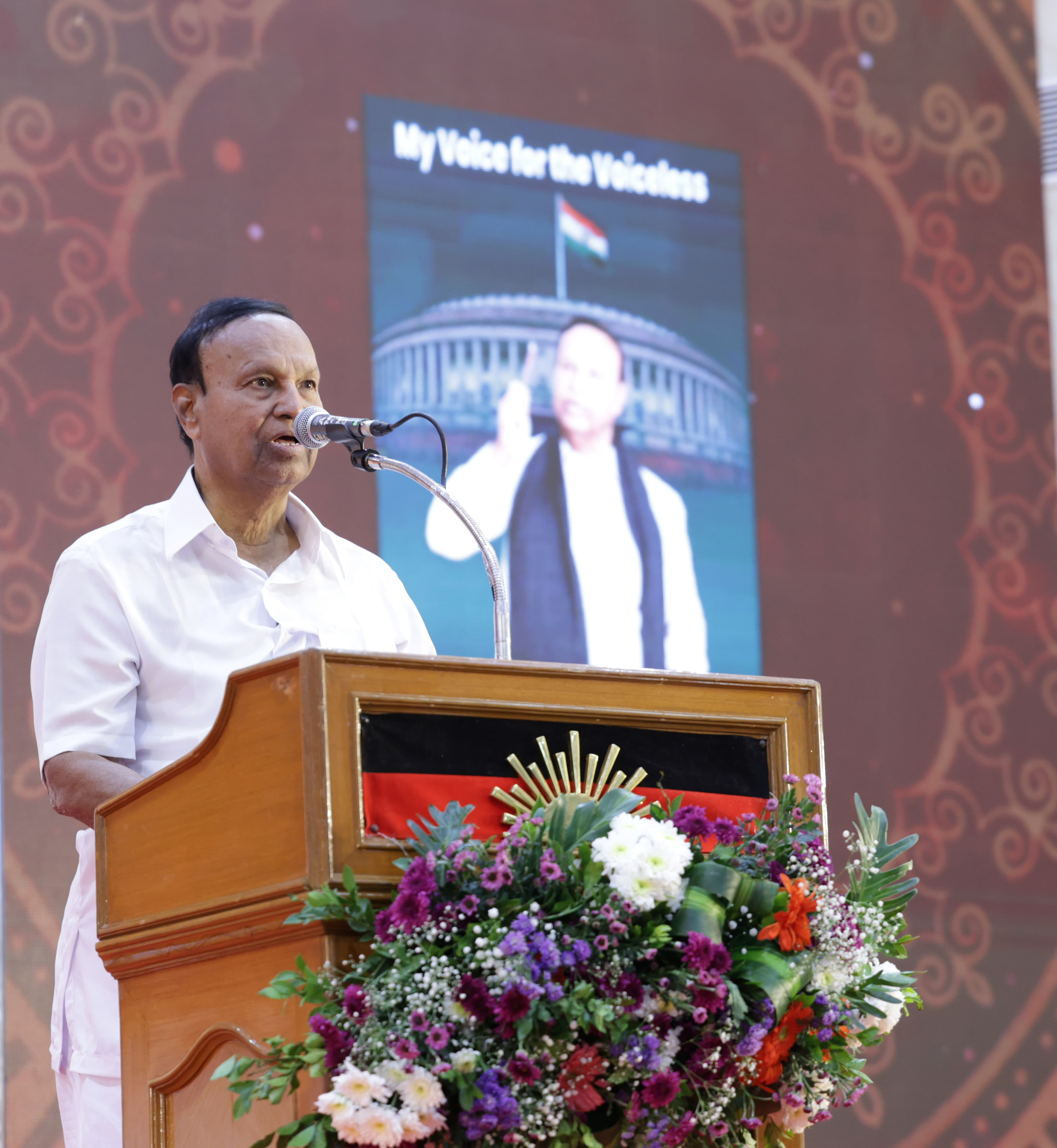
- Baalu in 2024

Treasurer of Dravida Munnetra Kazhagam
- Incumbent
- Assumed office 9 September 2020
- President: M. K. Stalin
- General Secretary: Durai Murugan

Union Minister of Road Transport, Highways and Shipping
- In office 22 May 2004 — 23 May 2009
- Prime Minister: Manmohan Singh
- Constituency: Chennai South, Tamil Nadu

Union Minister of Environment and Forests
- In office 13 October 1999 — 21 December 2003
- Prime Minister: Atal Bihari Vajpayee
- Constituency: Chennai South, Tamil Nadu

Union Minister of State for Petroleum, Natural Gas and Non-Conventional Energy Sources
- In office 6 July 1996 — 19 March 1998
- Prime Minister: H. D. Deve Gowda; Inder Kumar Gujral

Leader of Dravida Munnetra Kazhagam in Lok Sabha
- Incumbent
- Assumed office 24 May 2019

Member of Parliament, Lok Sabha
- Incumbent
- Assumed office 23 May 2019
- Preceded by: K. N. Ramachandran
- Constituency: Sriperumbudur, Tamil Nadu
- In office 16 May 2009 — 16 May 2014
- Preceded by: A. Krishnaswamy
- Succeeded by: K. N. Ramachandran
- Constituency: Sriperumbudur, Tamil Nadu
- In office 10 May 1996 – 16 May 2009
- Preceded by: R. Sridharan
- Succeeded by: C. Rajendran
- Constituency: Chennai South, Tamil Nadu

Member of Parliament, Rajya Sabha
- In office 30 June 1986 — 29 June 1992
- Constituency: Tamil Nadu

Principal Secretary of Dravida Munnetra Kazhagam
- In office August 2018 – January 2020
- President: M. K. Stalin

Personal details
- Born: T R Balasubramaniam (Ilamurugu Rasuthevar); 13 December 1941 (age 84) (15 June 1941 as per official records) Thalikottai, Tanjore, Madras Presidency, British Raj (present-day Tamil Nadu, India)
- Party: Dravida Munnetra Kazhagam
- Spouses: Renuka Devi Baalu (m. 1970; died 2025); Porkkodi TRB (m. 1970)
- Children: 5 (including T. R. B. Rajaa)
- Website: Official website

Thalikkottai Rajuthevar Baalu (born 13 December 1941) is an Indian politician. He is currently the MP of Lok Sabha of the Sriperumbudur constituency, elected seven times since 1996 from Chennai South and Sriperumbudur. He is a leader of the DMK party and is known for his political loyalty, having been in the party since 1957. He is now the Treasurer of DMK, elected unopposed on 3 September 2020. He earlier served as the Principal Secretary of the DMK Party from August 2018 to January 2020.

== Political career ==
Thalikottai Raju Baalu is a prominent leader in the DMK (Dravida Munnetra Kazhagam) Party. Baalu was born on 13 December 1941 (his official DOB remains as 15 June due to confusion at the time of his birth) to Rajuthevar and Vadivambal at Thalikottai in Tanjore district (nowadays Thiruvarur District) of Madras Presidency. He studied B.Sc. in New College (Madras University) and his diploma in drafting engineering drawings from the Central Polytechnic College, Chennai. Baalu's political career started at a very early age of sixteen when he joined the DMK party after being amused at a speech given by the late DMK Supremo Kalaignar in 1957. He was active in grass-root politics and made friends with his then neighbouring ward's youth wing personnel Stalin. Baalu later became the Party's Secretary for the bastion Chennai unit (Unsplit) in 1982.

Baalu was first elected to Parliament as a member of Rajya Sabha in 1986, marking the first electoral defeat of AIADMK since MGR came to power.

He then became a member of the Lok Sabha in 1996 from Chennai South and became a Deputy Minister in the Ministry of Petroleum and Natural Gas under Prime Minister Devegowda. Towards the end of his tenure, he also held additional charge of the then Ministry of Non-conventional Energy Sources (now called the Ministry of New and Renewable Energy). Baalu was re-elected to the Lok Sabha in 1998, 1999 and 2004 from the same constituency and again in 2009, 2019 and 2024 from the Thiruperumbudur constituency, losing power once in 2014 contesting from Thanjavur. Baalu served as Cabinet Minister of Environment and Forests from 1999 to December 2003 and as Minister of Shipping and Road Transport and Highways from 2004 to 2009 in the union cabinet.

T.R. Baalu is now the Leader of DMK Parliamentary Party in Lok Sabha and He also held the charge as Chairman of the Department Related Standing Committee of Parliament of the Ministry of Railways. In addition, Baalu was a member of several parliamentary committees like Ethics Committee, House Committee and Consultative Committee of Ministry of Finance. He is also a Member of International World Affairs Council (IWAC).

In his political career Baalu went to jail over 20 times for participating in demonstrations and agitations for public cause. He came to political limelight when he was jailed for one year under MISA along with DMK supremos, Maran and Dravidar Kazhagam leader K. Veeramani in 1976 for protesting against Emergency clamped in the country. He protested strongly against the midnight arrest and imprisonment of his party leader Karunanidhi on 30 June 2001. At that time, he was the union Minister of Environment, Forest and Climate Change. And it was the first time, a Cabinet Minister to be arrested by a State's Police Force.

T.R Baalu had filed a defamation case against Annamalai for allegations of corruption in 2023. He later dropped the case in 2026.

== Personal life ==
Baalu was married to his long-term love Renuka Devi (died 2025) and later to his niece Porkkodi, and has three sons and two daughters. His second son T R B Rajaa (Renuka) is considered to be his political successor, having won 3 consecutive Tamil Nadu Assembly elections from their native constituency Mannargudi and has a high office in the party (as DMK IT Wing Secretary) and in the Tamil Nadu Government (as Industries, IP and Commerce Minister until May 2026), while his other 2 sons Selvakumaar (Ren.), Rajkumar (Por.) and the eldest daughter Devi Kanchana (Por.) take care of the businesses and institution, while the younger Manonmani (Por.) previously worked as a reporter-journalist in Tamil news channels.

Baalu's first wife Renuka Devi died on the 19th of August 2025 due to age-related ailments at the age of 79 with her husband, 2 sons and their family by her side.

== Elections contested and positions held ==
=== Lok Sabha ===
Year	Constituency	Party	Votes	%	Opponent	Opponent Party	Opponent Votes	%	Result	Margin	%
2024	Sriperumbudur	DMK	758,611	52.63	G. Premkumar	AIADMK	271,582	18.84	Won	487,029	33.79
2019	Sriperumbudur	DMK	793,281	56.53	A. Vaithilingam	PMK	285,326	20.33	Won	507,955	36.2
2014	Thanjavur	DMK	366,188	36.62	K. Parasuraman	AIADMK	510,307	51.03	Lost	-144,119	-14.41
2009	Sriperumbudur	DMK	352,641	44.44	A. K. Moorthy	PMK	327,605	41.28	Won	25,036	3.16
2004	Chennai South	DMK	564,578	60.41	Bader Sayeed	AIADMK	343,838	36.79	Won	220,740	23.62
1999	Chennai South	DMK	562,221	60.03	V. Dhandayuthapani	INC	322,037	34.39	Won	240,184	25.64
1998	Chennai South	DMK	432,913	48.17	Jana Krishnamurthi	BJP	412,899	45.94	Won	20,014	2.23
1996	Chennai South	DMK	538,697	61.97	H. Ganesham	AIADMK	199,516	22.95	Won	339,181	39.02
1991	Chennai South	DMK	255,965	34.66	R. Sridharan	AIADMK	418,493	56.66	Lost	-162,528	-22

- 1986–1992 : was elected as a Member, Rajya Sabha. This is considered to be Former TN CM Dr.MGR's first electoral defeat.
- 1996: Elected to Lok Sabha (Eleventh) for the 1st time
- 1996-1998: Minister of State, Petroleum, Natural Gas and Non-Conventional Energy Sources
- 1998: Elected to Lok Sabha (Twelfth) for the second time
- 1999: Elected to Lok Sabha (Thirteenth) for the third time
- 1999-2003: Cabinet Minister, Environment and Forests
- 2004: Elected to Lok Sabha (Fourteenth) for the fourth time from Chennai South (Lok Sabha constituency)
- 2004-2009: Cabinet minister for Shipping, Road Transport & Highways.
- 2009: Elected to Lok Sabha (Fifteenth) for the fifth time from Sriperumbudur
- 2019: Elected to Lok Sabha (Seventeenth) for the sixth time from Sriperumbudur
- 2024: Elected to Lok Sabha (Eighteenth) for the seventh time from Sriperumbudur

== List of Positions Held ==
Date / Period	Position / Role
June 2024 –	Elected to 18th Lok Sabha; Member, Committee on Public Accounts (14 Aug 2024); Member of the Committee on Welfare of Other Backward Classes (16 Aug. 2024 onwards); Member, committee on Railways (26-Sep-2024 onwards); Member, Joint Committee on the Viksit Bharat Shiksha Adhishthan Bill, 2025 (10-Feb-2026)
May 2019 - 2024	Re-elected to 17th Lok Sabha (Six Terms); Member, Committee on Public Accounts (24 July 2019 onwards); Member, Standing Committee on Railways (13 Sept. 2019 onwards); Member, Committee of Privileges (09 Oct. 2019 onwards); Member, General Purposes Committee, Lok Sabha (21 Nov. 2019 onwards); Member, Consultative Committee, Ministry of Home Affairs; Member, Committee on Welfare of Other Backward Classes (16 Sept. 2022 onwards)
2009-2014	Re-elected to 15th Lok Sabha (Five Terms); Leader, DMK Party in Parliament (May 2009 onwards); Member, Business Advisory Committee (29 Jun. 2009); Chairman, Standing Committee on Railways (31 Aug. 2009); Member, Consultative Committee, Ministry of Finance (16 Sep. 2009); Member, Committee on Ethics (7 Oct. 2009); Member, General Purposes Committee (19 Oct. 2009); Member, Standing Committee on Social Justice and Empowerment (4 Nov. 2009); Member, Parliamentary Forum on Water Conservation and Management (22 Jan. 2010); Member, House Committee (9 June. 2013)
2004-2009	Re-elected to 14th Lok Sabha (Four Terms); Union Cabinet Minister, Shipping, Road Transport & Highways (22 May 2004 - 22 May 2009); Leader of the DMK Party in Parliament; Member, various Cabinet Committees including; Cabinet Committee on Political Affairs (CCPA); Cabinet committee on Economic Affairs (CCEA) etc.; Member, United Progressive Alliance (UPA) Coordination Committee; Chairperson, Transport Ministers of SAARC countries (2007-2008)
1999 :	Re-elected to 13th Lok Sabha (Three Terms); President (23 Oct. 2002-1 Dec. 2003); Conference of Parties (COP); United Nations Framework Convention on Climate Change (UNFCCC); Union Cabinet Minister, Environment & Forests (13 Oct. 1999- 21 Dec. 2003)
1998-99	Re-elected to 12th Lok Sabha (Two Terms); Member, Parliamentary Committee on Railways; Member, Parliamentary Consultative Committee, Ministry of Home Affairs
1996-98	Elected to 11th Lok Sabha; Union Minister of State, Petroleum and Natural Gas; Whip, DMK Party in Parliament
1986-92	Member, Rajya Sabha; Member, Public Accounts Committee; Member, Committee on Rules (Rajya Sabha)
1982 - 1993	Secretary, D.M.K., Madras District Unit
1957 onwards	Member, Dravida Munnetra Kazhagam (D.M.K.)

== As a member of parliament and minister ==
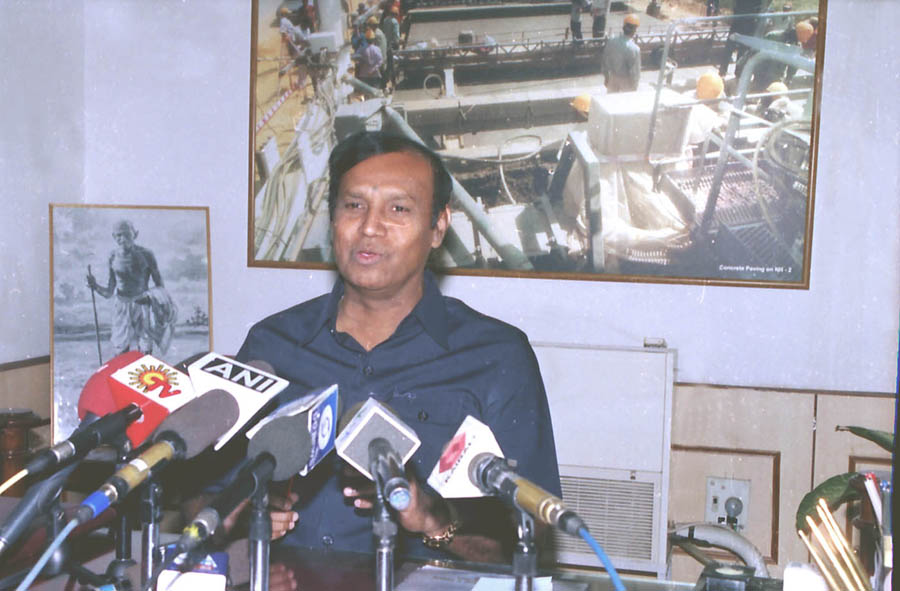
T. R. Baalu assumes the charge of Union Minister for Shipping, Road Transport and Highways in New Delhi on 26 May 2004

Baalu is one of the prominent leaders to work towards the implementation of Sethusamudram Shipping Canal Project. He was handling it during his tenure as the minister of Shipping, Road Transport and Highways. The project proposes linking the Palk Bay and the Gulf of Mannar between India and Sri Lanka by creating a shipping canal through the shallow sea sometimes called Setu Samudram, and through the chain of islands variously known as Ram Sethu or the Adam's Bridge. A few organisations are opposing the dredging of Ramasethu on religious, environmental and economical grounds. Many of these parties and organisations support implementation of this project using one of the five alternative alignments considered earlier without damaging the structure considered sacred by Hindus. During 2006, the Supreme Court Baalu quashed a case requesting a ban on the project and issues notices to Baalu and the environment ministry. With 22 km of dredging remaining, the project is held from March 2010 by a Supreme Court order seeking the Central Government to clarify the status of the bridge as a national monument. He was recruited as a minister in 2009 during the second term on UPA coalition government as it was reported that the Prime Minister was unhappy with Baalu over the corruption charges in Sethusamudram project. But he continued as the head of the DMK parliamentary party and also part of various central committees.

DMK pulled out of the ruling UPA on 20 March 2013 following widespread protests in Tamil Nadu against the central government for not taking up the concerns of Tamils in Sri Lanka in the UN resolution against the alleged human rights violation against Tamils by Sri Lankan government. Baalu, the head of MPs from the DMK party, to tender resignation in the Prime minister's office and to hand over the letter of withdrawal to the President on 20 March 2013.

On the Joint parliamentary committee constituted to examine the 2G case, Baalu was the only representative from the DMK in the committee and he, along with other opposition members, snubbed the report as "half boiled" as the draft report gave a clean chit to Prime Minister Manmohan Singh and Finance Minister P Chidambaram, while implicating the DMK minister A. Raja.

Party political offices
Preceded by	Leader of the Dravida Munnetra Kazhagam Party in the 15th Lok Sabha; 2009–2014	Succeeded by
