= K. Parasuraman =

Indian politician (1960–2024)

Member of the India Parliament for Thanjavur
- In office 1 September 2014 – 23 May 2019
- Constituency: Thanjavur

Personal details
- Born: 15 December 1960 Pudur, Thanjavur district, Tamil Nadu, India
- Died: 6 February 2024 (aged 63)
- Party: Dravida Munnetra Kazhagam
- Spouse: Smt. P. Vijayalakshmi
- Children: 2
- Occupation: Agriculture
- As of 17 December, 2016

K. Parasuraman (15 December 1960 – 6 February 2024) was an Indian politician who was a Member of Parliament from Tamil Nadu. He was elected to the Lok Sabha from Thanjavur constituency as an Anna Dravida Munnetra Kazhagam candidate in the 2014 election. Parasuraman died on 6 February 2024, at the age of 63.
