= N. Ashokkumar =

Indian politician

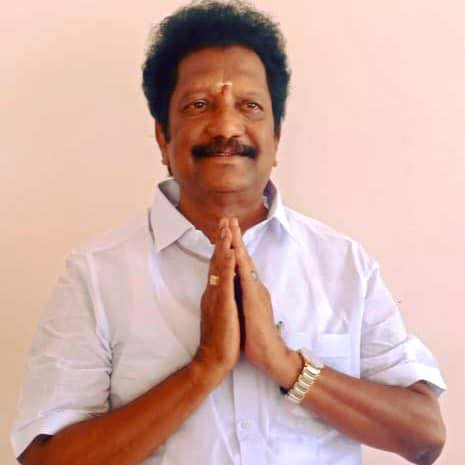

Member of Tamil Nadu Legislative Assembly
- Incumbent
- Assumed office 12 May 2021

Personal details
- Born: 15 April 1957 (age 69)
- Spouse: A. Parimala
- Children: Karki Ashokkumar, Keerthi Ashokkumar
- Occupation: Politician, Social Service, Agriculture, Business

Narayanasamy Ashokkumar (born 1957) is an Indian politician from Tamil Nadu, India. He is a member of the Tamil Nadu Legislative Assembly from Peravurani Assembly constituency, in Thanjavur District, representing the Dravida Munnetra Kazhagam (DMK). He retained the Peravurani seat in the 2026 Tamil Nadu Legislative Assembly election.

== Personal life ==
N. Ashokkumar was born on 15 April 1957 to V. Narayanasamy (father) and N. Jayam (mother) from Veeraiyankottai Village, Peravurani Taluk, Thanjavur District and settled in Peravurani Town. He completed his PUC in Debritto School, Devakkottai, Tamil Nadu. He is the son in law of DMK leader, Misa Krishnamoorthi, a former MLA and Saraswathi. He has two siblings N. Elango and N. Sumathi.

== Political career ==
N. Ashokkumar is a social worker in Peruvurani. His political career started in 1975 when he joined the Dravida Munnetra Kazhagam (DMK) party. He won in the Peruratchi election for the position of chairman in the years of 2006 and 2011.

Tamil Nadu Legislative Assembly Election
Year	Party	Constituency	Result
2021-2026	DMK	Peravurani	Won
2016-2021	DMK	Peravurani	Lost
