= Pattukkottai block =

Pattukkottai block is a revenue block in the Pattukkottai taluk of Thanjavur district, Tamil Nadu, India. There are a total of 43 villages in this block.

== List of Panchayat Villages ==
| SI.No | Panchayat Village |
|---|---|
| 1 | Alathur |
| 2 | Anaikkadu |
| 3 | Athikkottai |
| 4 | Eanathi |
| 5 | Eripurakarai |
| 6 | Kalugapulikkadu |
| 7 | Karambayam |
| 8 | Kargavayal |
| 9 | Kondikulam |
| 10 | Mahilankottai |
| 11 | Malavenirkadu |
| 12 | Maliakkadu |
| 13 | Mudalcheri |
| 14 | Naduvikkottai |
| 15 | Nambivayal |
| 16 | Narasingapuram |
| 17 | Nattuchalai |
| 18 | Othiadikkadu |
| 19 | Palamuthi |
| 20 | Palanjur |
| 21 | Pallikondan |
| 22 | Pannaivayal |
| 23 | Parakakalakottai |
| 24 | Ponnavarayankottai |
| 25 | Pudukkottai Ullur |
| 26 | Rajamadam |
| 27 | Santhankadu |
| 28 | Sembalur |
| 29 | Sendakkottai |
| 30 | Sendankadu |
| 31 | Soorappallam |
| 32 | Sundaranayagipuram |
| 33 | T.maravakkadu |
| 34 | T.melakkadu |
| 35 | T.vadakadu |
| 36 | Thamarankottai (north) |
| 37 | Thamarankottai (south) |
| 38 | Thittakkudi |
| 39 | Thokkalikkadu |
| 40 | Thuvarankuruchi |
| 41 | Veerakurichi |
| 42 | Vendakkottai |
| 43 | Veppankkadu |
