= Sethubhavachatram block =

Sethubhavachatram block is a revenue block in the Peravurani taluk of Thanjavur district, Tamil Nadu, India. There are a total of 37 villages in the block. The block development office is located at Peravurani

== List of Panchayat Villages ==
SI.No	Panchayat Village
1	Adaikathevan
2	Alagiyanayagipuram
3	Andikkadu
4	Chokkanathapuram
5	Gangatharapuram
6	Kalanivasal
7	Karambakkadu
8	Kattayankadu Ukkadai
9	Kolakkudi
10	Kollukkadu
11	Kuppathevan
12	Kuruvikkarambai
13	Manakkadu
14	Marakkavalasai
15	Marungappallam
16	Mudachikadu
17	Mudhukadu
18	Nadiyam
19	Pallathur
20	Poovanam
21	Puduppattinam
22	Pukkarambai
23	Rendampulikadu
24	Rettavayal
25	Rowthanvayal
26	Ruthirachinthamani
27	Sarabendrarajapattinam
28	Sembiyanmadevipattinam
29	Senthalaivayal
30	Serubalakkadu
31	Sethubavachatram
32	Solaikadu
33	Thiruvathevan
34	Umathanadu
35	Vathalaikkadu
36	Veerayankottai
37	Vilangulam
