= Peravurani block =

Peravurani block is a revenue block in the Peravurani taluk of Thanjavur district, Tamil Nadu, India. There are 26 villages in the block. The block development office is located at Avanam.

== List of Panchayat villages ==
SI.No	Panchayat Village
1	Alivalam
2	Ammaiyandi
3	Edaiyathi
4	Kalagam
5	Kalathur
6	Kalluranikkadu
7	Kuruchi
8	Madathikkadu
9	Mavadukuruchi
10	Ottankadu
11	Paingal
12	Palathali
13	Palayanagaram
14	Periyanayagipuram
15	Pinnavasal
16	Poovalur
17	Punavasal
18	Sengamangalam
19	Serubalakkadu
20	Seruvaviduthi North
21	Seruvaviduthi South
22	Sornakkadu
23	Thennankudi
24	Thiruchitrambalam
25	Thuravikkadu
26	Valapiramankadu
27	Vattathikkottai
28	Karambakkadu
29	kalanivasal
30	Arasalamkarambai
