= Mahilankottai =

Mahilankottai Magizhangkottai
- village
- Interactive map of Mahilankottai
- Coordinates: 10.33326°N 79.36534°E
- Country: India
- State: Tamil Nadu
- District: Thanjavur
- Taluk: Pattukkottai

Population (2011)
  - Total: 1,014

Languages
  - Official: Tamil
- Time zone: UTC+5:30 (IST)
- PIN: 614 701

Mahilankottai (Magizhangkottai) is a village panchayat in Pattukkottai taluk of Thanjavur district, Tamil Nadu, South India.

Chennai is the state capital for Mahilankottai . It is located around 323 kilometer away from Magizhankottai. The other nearest state capital from Magizhangkottai is Pondicherry and its distance is 185 km. The other surrounding state capitals are Thiruvananthapuram (Kerala) 324.5 km, Bangalore (Karnataka) 350.8 km.

The surrounding nearby villages and Towns and its distance from Magizhangkottai are Adirampattinam 4 km Thambikottai, Sendakkottai 2.9 km, Rajamadam 3.3 km, Pudukkottai Ullur 3.6 km, Pallikondan 4.2 km, Malavenirkadu 4.8 km, Palanjur 4.9 km, Thuvarankuruchi 6.9 km, Ponnavarayankottai 7.0 km, Anaikkadu 7.1 km, Vendakkottai 9.8 km, Thamarankottai ( South) 10.1 km, Pattukkottai 10.2 km, Kondikulam 11.1 km, Nattuchalai 12.3 km, Aladikkumulai 12.3 km, Sendankadu 13.7 km, Veerakuruchi 14.8 km, Sembalur 15.6 km, Nambivayal 16.3 km, Karambayam 17.6 km, T.maravakkadu, Pannavayal, Thittagudi, Enathi.

== Demographics ==
As per the 2011 census, Mahilankottai had a total population of 1014 with 462 males and 552 females. The literacy rate was 72.38%. Mahilankottai is famous for Shri Aahasa Mariyamman Temple, Karapaga Vinayagar Temple, Sithi Vinayagar Temple, Shri Om Padai Ayyanar Temple, Shri Peramaiya Ayyanar Temple, Shri Raja Gopala Swami Temple, Valuthiyamman Temple, Sri Sambuga moorthy temple, Thavathiru Sri. Singaravadivel Swamigal and Annai Matha Church.

In Mahilankottai village population of children with age 0-6 is 109 which makes up 10.75% of the total population of the village. Average Sex Ratio of Mahilankottai village is 1195 which is higher than Tamil Nadu state average of 996. Child Sex Ratio for the Mahilankottai as per census is 1019, higher than Tamil Nadu average of 943.

It is known for its good water resource, and provides drinking water to nearby villages.

Most of the villagers in Mahilankottai depends on agriculture to earn their livelihood. Farmers grow coconut, groundnut, maize (corn), and black gram. Besides agriculture, there are doctors, engineers, teachers, businessmen and people of other professionals.

As per the constitution of India and Panchyati Raaj Act, Mahilankottai village is administrated by Sarpanch (Head of Village) who is elected representative of village.

Particulars	Total	Male	Female
Total No. of Houses	245	-	-
Population	1,014	462	552
Child (0-6)	109	54	55
Literacy	72.38%	80.64%	65.59%

Near By Cities: Pattukottai, Adirampattinam,

== Transport ==
This village is having certain bus timings from Pattukottai and Adirampattinam (From 6 AM IST to 10 PM IST) Buses like (Govt bus no:14A, privates buses saraswathi transport, Sjn transport)

East Coast Road (State Highway 49) is located very close to this village, which connects Chennai, Pondicherry, Nagapattinam, Velankanni, Thoothukudi and all other cities located near Bay of Bengal - South.

== Notable people ==
- Kanakesa Thevar & N.Kandasamy Thever Ex V.H.M
