= Sengapaduthankadu =

Sengai, Thamarankottai
- Street
- Thamarankottai
- Location in Tamil Nadu, India Sengai, Thamarankottai (India)
- Coordinates: 10.43°N 79.32°E
- Country: India
- State: Tamil Nadu
- District: Thanjavur
- Taluk: Pattukkottai

Languages
  - Official: Tamil
- Time zone: UTC+5:30 (IST)
- PIN: 614613
- Telephone code: 91 4373
- Vehicle registration: TN 49

Sengapaduthankadu is a hamlet in Thamarankottai village, which is an agricultural village in Cauvery Delta area. It comes under Pattukkottai taluk and Thanjavur district in Tamil Nadu, India. Pattukkottai and Adirampattinam are the nearby major towns. It is surrounded by many villages Thuvarankurichi, Mannangadu, Parakakalakottai, Thambikottai, Palanjur, Narasingapuram and Sundarannayakipuram.

Sengapaduthankadu in Thamarankottai is the birthplace of the great poet Pattukkottai Kalyanasundaram . The place is near to the sea. Thamarankottai reserved forest is located near to this hamlet.

Manora (a big tower used by olden kings to guard the entry against enemies) is nearby this place

The main occupation in this village is agriculture – rice, groundnuts, coconut, and sesame are cultivated.
