= Alathur, Thanjavur =

Alathur ATR
- village
- Location in Tamil Nadu, India Alathur (India)
- Coordinates: 10.492°N 79.348°E
- Country: India
- State: Tamil Nadu
- District: Thanjavur

Government
  - Type: Unicameral

Area
  - Total: 8.2 km^{2} (3.2 sq mi)
  - Rank: 4

Population (2011)
  - Total: 4,733
  - Rank: 8
  - Density: 580/km^{2} (1,500/sq mi)

Languages
  - Official: Tamil
- Time zone: UTC+5:30 (IST)
- PIN: 614901
- Telephone code: 04373
- Vehicle registration: TN 49

Alathur is a village in Pattukkottai taluk of Thanjavur district, Tamil Nadu, India. Alathur village is a division of Musugundha Nadu part of Chola Nadu.It is located approximately eight kilometers from Pattukkottai - Mannargudi with the well-connected road of State Highway (SH 146) a route called Sethubachathiram Road. It is the third biggest village in pattukkottai taluk after Thamarankottai and Thambikottai. Alathur is an Agricultural community, Commercial market and Centres.

== Administration ==
- Panchayath Villages: Alathur
- Revenue Villages:
  - Alathur
  - Musiri
  - Vadugankuthagai
  - Mahadevapuram

== Demographics ==
According to the 2011 census, Alathur had a total population of 4733 with 2163 males, 2570 females and 475 children. The literacy rate was 77.05 percent.

== Geography ==
The village was formed by the union of two regions, Alathur and Mahadevapuram, each of 700 acres (2.8 km^{2}) which later became the single village of Alathur 1,400 acres (5.7 km^{2}). It is surrounded by Madukur, Alampallam, Sembaloore, Mullur Pattikadu, Thalikottai, Pulavanji, Ambalapattu and Thittakudi. Alathur is a most developed village in Thanjavur district.

A branch of the Kallanikalvai (a canal from Cauvery River) runs through the centre of Alathur, which is surrounded by irrigation canals and water storage areas such as Pudukulam, Pudu Lake, Veeranar kulam, Sivan kovil kulam, Oddai, Nara Panai. This abundance of irrigation supports paddy, coconut farms, sugarcane, etc.

Sri Veeranar ayyanar temple is famous temple in Alathur and also surrounding areas.

It has almost all temples within its area such as Lord Sivan temple, Lord Ganapathy, Lord Muruga, Goddess Kaliamman, Goddess Kamatchi Amman, and Muniyappan temple.

== See also ==
- Sri Malaiperumal Koil
