= Thittakudi, Thanjavur district =

Thittakudi
- village
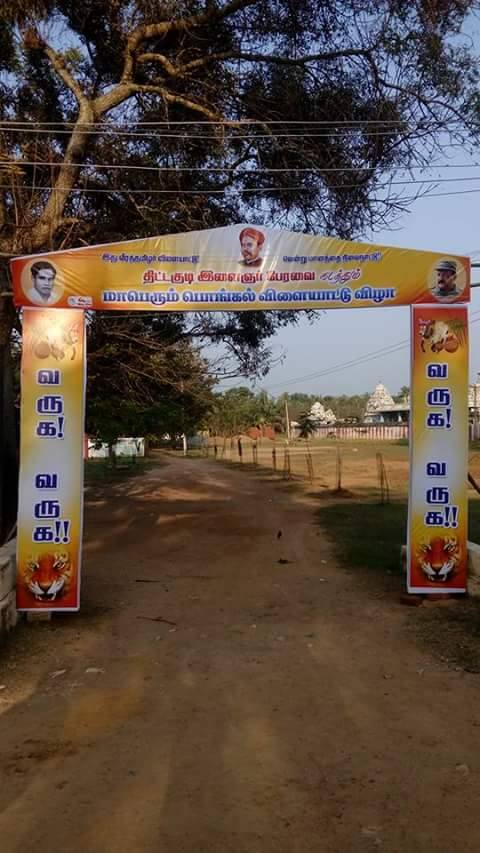
- Thittakudi village
- Interactive map of Thittakudi
- Coordinates: 10.481752°N 79.332473°E
- Country: India
- State: Tamil Nadu
- District: Thanjavur
- Taluk: Pattukkottai

Government
  - Panchayat President: Kaathavarayan

Population (2011)
  - Total: 737

Languages
  - Official: Tamil
- Time zone: UTC+5:30 (IST)
- Website: www.thittakudi.com

Thittakudi is a village in the Pattukkottai taluk of Thanjavur district, Tamil Nadu, India.

== Demographics ==
As per the 2001 census, Thittakkudi had a total population of 450 with 213 males and 237 females. The sex ratio was 1113. The literacy rate was 53.17.

== Musugundan community villages ==
Sundampatti, Mattankal, Seventhanpatti, Kattayankadu Pudukkotai Ulur, Keerathur, Paalamuthi, Pallathur, Eanathi, Aladikkumulai, Soorangadu, Soorapallam, Athikkottai, Sedangadu, Thittakudi, Sembalur, Alathur, Alampalam, Pattikkadu, Pulavanchi, Karuppur, Andami, Keelakuruchi, Nemmeli, Sirankudi, Madukkur North, Vikramam, Vattakudi, Thamarankottai, Sengapaduthankadu, Mannangadu, Kasankadu, Moothakkurichi, Silambavelankadu, Nattuchalai, Vendakkottai

== Temples ==
- Sivan kovil
- Ayyanar kovil
- Bhairavar kovil
- Maariyamman kovil
- Veeranaar kovil

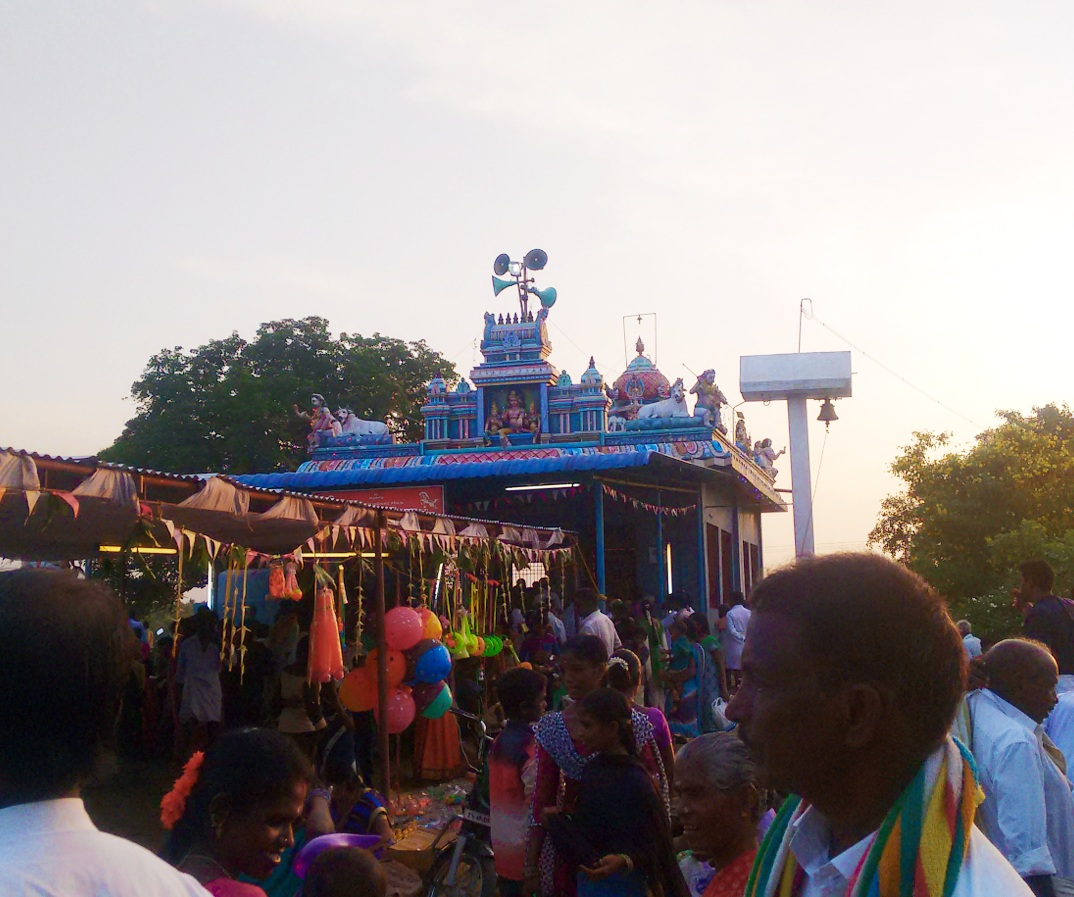
This picture was taken during Ayyanar Kovil Thiruvilla

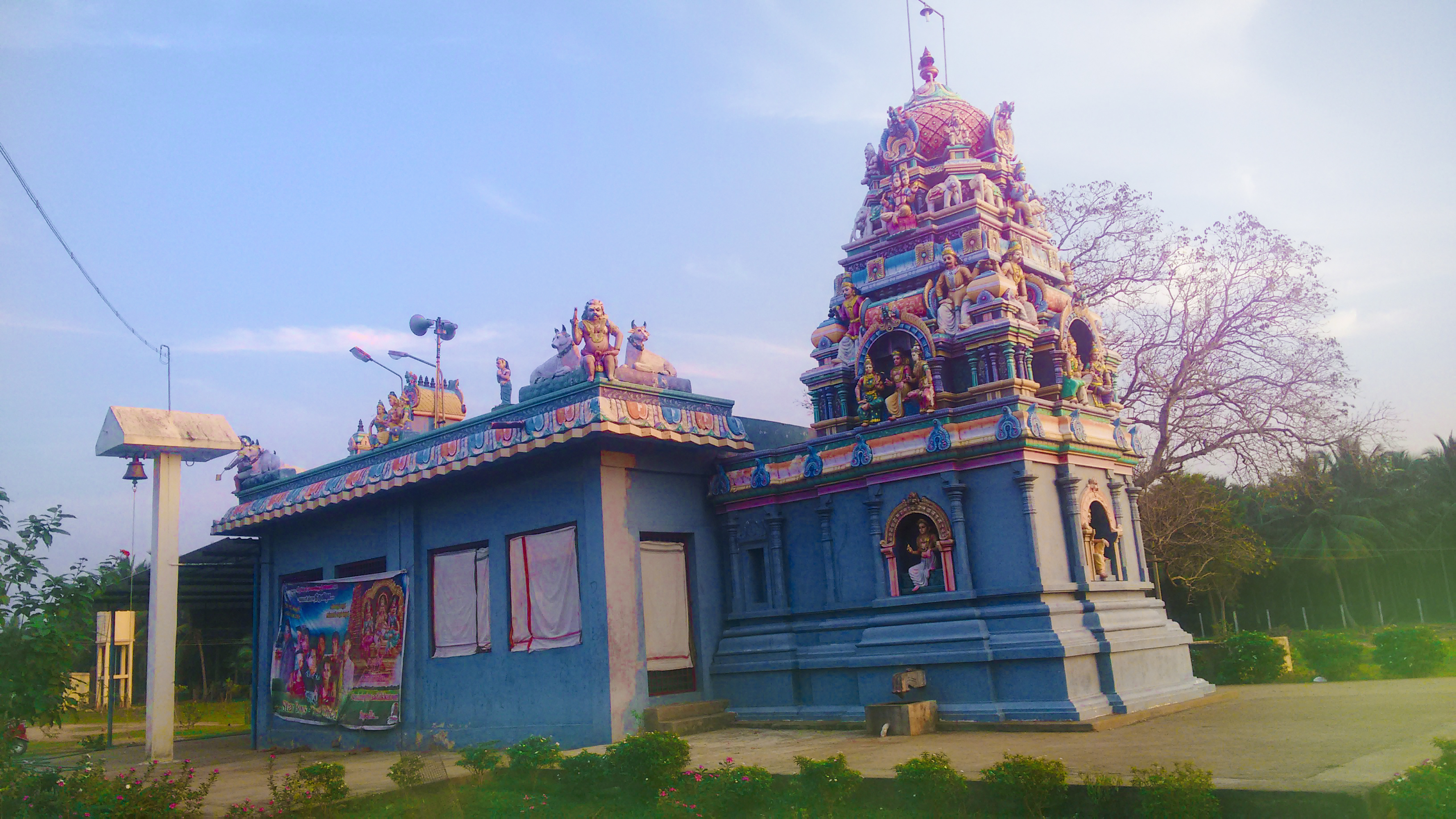
Side view

- Pattavan kovil

== Ponds ==
- Poovaandi kulam
- Ayyanar kulam
- Sevanthan kulam
- Vellar odai

== Sports ==
Volleyball and Kabadi.
