= Mallipattinam =

- village
- Nickname: malli
- Location in Tamil Nadu, India Mallipattinam (India)
- Coordinates: 10°16′50.02″N 79°19′1.13″E
- Country: India
- State: Tamil Nadu
- District: Thanjavur
- Taluk: Pattukkottai

Languages
  - Official: Tamil
- Time zone: UTC+5:30 (IST)
- PIN: 614723
- Website: www.mallipattinam.com

Mallipattinam is a coastal village in the Pattukkottai taluk of Thanjavur district, Tamil Nadu, India.The popular town near to mallipattinam are Adirampattinam.Mallipattinam is 20.5 km distance from its Taluk Main Town Pattukkottai. Mallipattinam is 66.5 km from its District Main City Thanjavur, and 362 km from its State Main City Chennai.

== History ==
The name Sarabendra Raja was granted to Serfoji II. On these ground the place came to known as Sarabendrarajapattinam. The village has two other names : Tulukkanvayal & Caluvanaickan pattinam. As Caluvanaikan pattinam was gateway to the sea route of Sri Lanka.

Portuguese, Danish, French and English, all came here and retained their holds in making their respective plotted histories. It was such a condition of war in a medium of commerce and trade that Caluvanaickan Pattinam became a strategic site and attained the status of a port.

The Tulukkanvayal village where Muslims, given to sea trading, settled in good numbers. These people were called Chonakas. The coromandel coast population had a great fraction of mohamedans.Nagore, Adirampattinam and like towns certify to this.

== Tourism ==
=== Manora ===
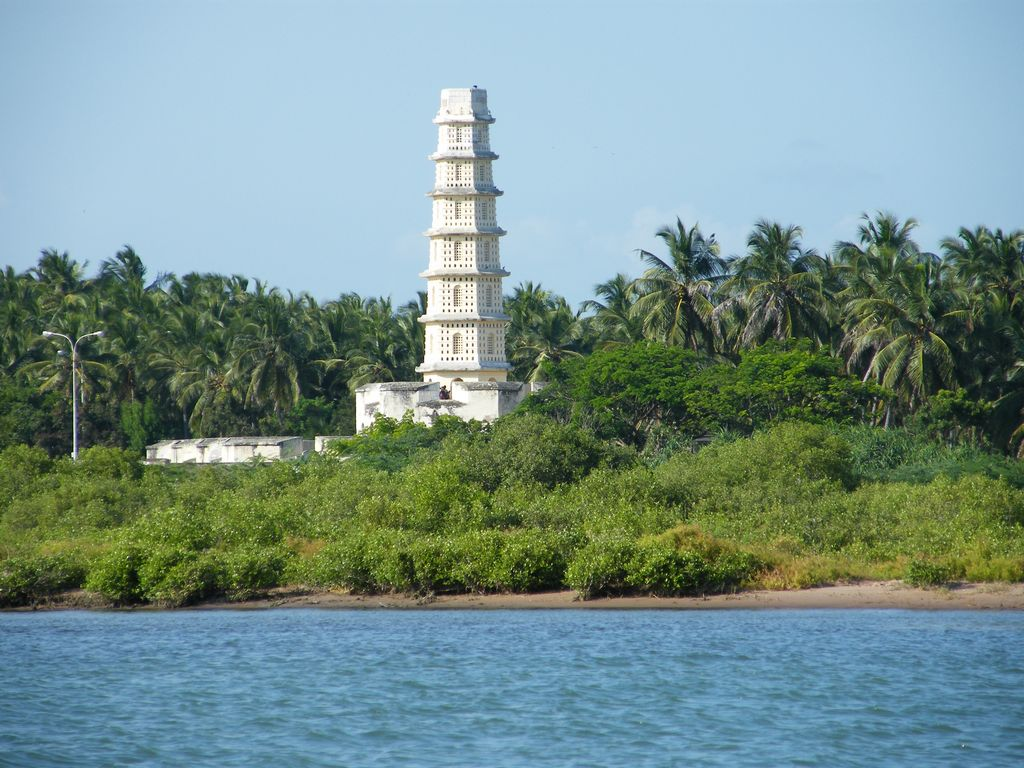
Manora Fort

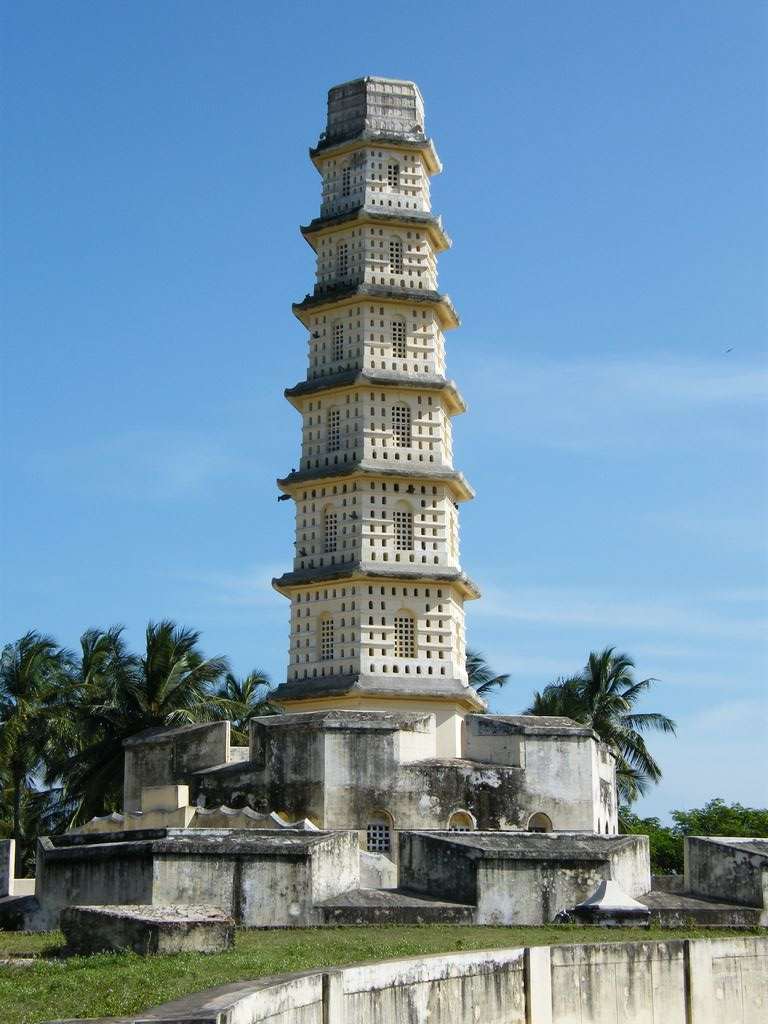
Manora1

Manora Fort was built by Tanjavur Maratha ruler Serfoji II (1777–1832 CE) in 1814–1815 to commemorate the victory of the British over Napoleon Bonaparte at Waterloo in 1815. The fort acted as a residence for the royal family and also as a light-house. A stone inscription reads "a friend and ally of the British to commemorate triumphs of British Arms and downfall of Bonaparte".

The word Manora is believed to be derived from the word minar meaning tower. The fort is hexagonal structure and has eight storeys, raising to a height of 75 ft (23 m) tapering to its top. The tower is surrounded by a wall and a moat ant it resembles a fort. The monument looks like a pagoda, with arched windows, circular staircase and eaves separating one storey from the other.

Manora has an eight storied victory tower. The name Manora is derived from the minaret meaning small minar. From the top of this tower, one has a panoramic view of the palm-fringed Bay of Bengal. The tower has also served as a lighthouse. Manora is located about 15 km east of Peravurani.

== Economy ==
=== Fishing Harbour ===
The main occupation of mallipattinam is fishing in the waters of Bay of Bengal. In the Mallipattinam fishing harbor, there are about 213 mechanized fishing boats (12m length), 102 vallam and 967 traditional fishing crafts operating from this jetty, with an annual fish landing of about 5000T.
