= Kurichi (disambiguation) =

Kurichi may refer to:

== Places ==
- Kurichi, a neighborhood of Coimbatore, Tamil Nadu, India
- Kurichi, Salem, a village in Salem district, Tamil Nadu, India
- Kurichi, Thanjavur, a village in Thanjavur district, Tamil Nadu, India
- Kurichy, a village in Kottayam district, Kerala, India
