= Ruthirachinthamani =

Ruthirachinthamani is a village in Sethubhavachatram block, Peravurani taluk of Thanjavur district, Tamil Nadu, India.

== Demographics ==
In the 2011 census, Ruthirachinthamani had a population of 1,751 (862 males, 889 females). The literacy rate was 82.28%, higher than the 80.09% literacy rate of Tamil Nadu.
