= Serangulam =

Serankulam or Serangulam or Serangolam, is a village in Mannargudi Taluk of Thiruvarur District in Tamil Nadu in India.

Serangolam is about 5 kilometers from Mannargudi and can be reached by buses, auto-rickshaws and a mini-bus. Serangolam is roughly about 330 kilometers from Chennai.

== Demographics ==
According to the 2011 India Census, Serangulam had a population of 2840 including 1467 males and 1373 females. 2078 were deemed literate and the worker population was 1232.

== Religious Significance ==
In the Tamil Srivaishnava tradition, Serangolam (aka, Serankulam, Serangulam) is one of five villages collectively known as Panchagramam. The other villages are Karappangadu, Nammankurichi, Peravoorani and Puliyakkudi (Idaikkadu).

=== Oral tradition about Panchagramam ===
Once upon a time, a group of Srivaishnavas from Kooram, Kidambi and Selperi (near Kanchipuram) set off on a pilgrimage. One nightfall, they stopped at the place now known as Karappangadu. That night, they had a dream in which the Lord directed them to an anthill (marked by a flying Garuda) in which they were to find a deity. The Lord directed the Srivaishnavas to build a temple and chant the Divya Prabhandam for HIM. Thus, the town of Karappangadu was formed. As days went by, the families from Karappangadu settled in the near-by areas. They got settled in Peraavoorani, Nammankurichi, Puliyakkudi, and Serangolam - these came to be called "The Panchagramams" (meaning: "The 5 villages") along with Karappangaadu.

== Temple ==
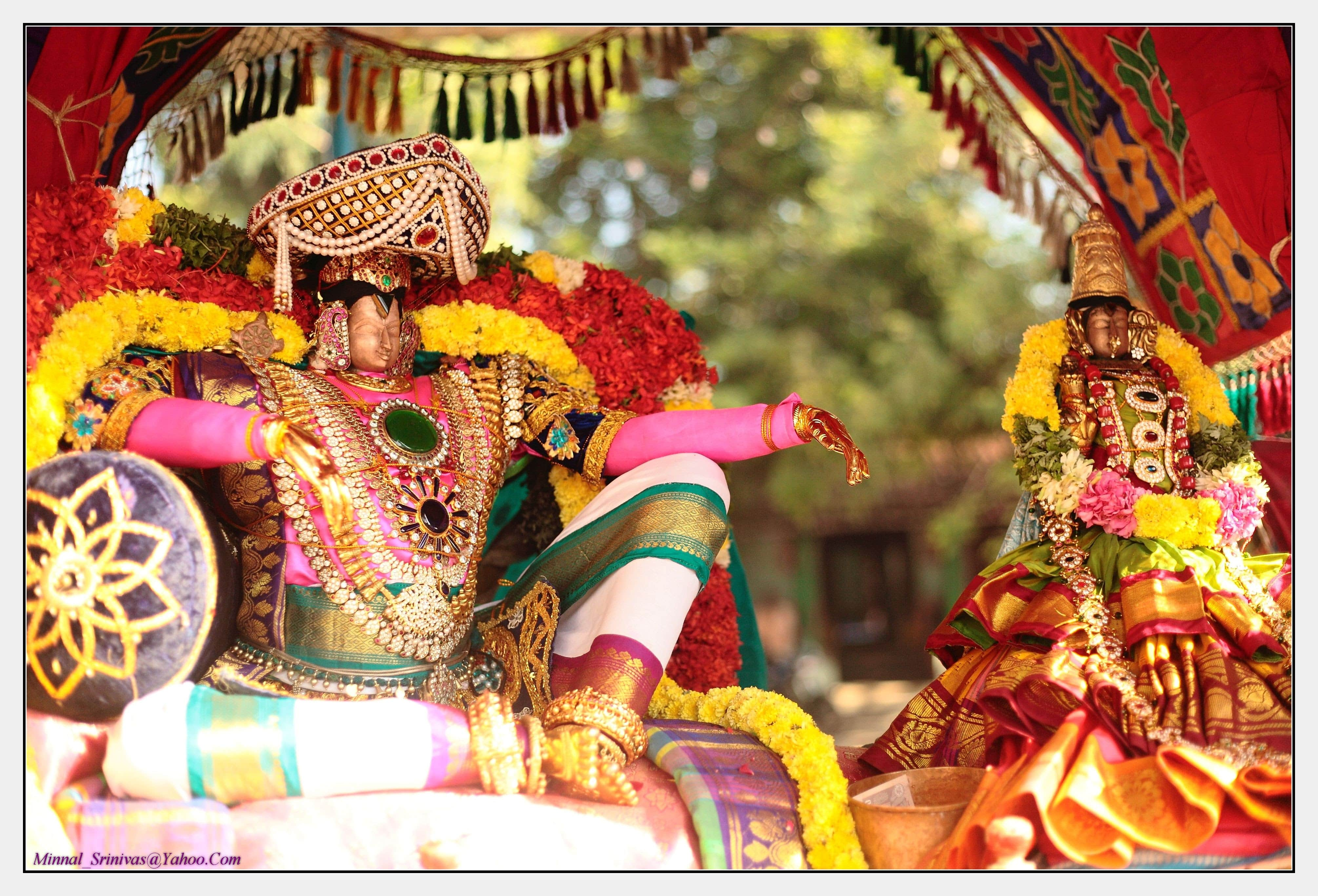

Serangolam has a temple dedicated to Lord Srinivasa, located on the banks of the river Paamani, a branch of Cauvery until it unites with Bay of Bengal in the town of Muthupettai.
