= Senthalaivayal =

- Gram panchayat
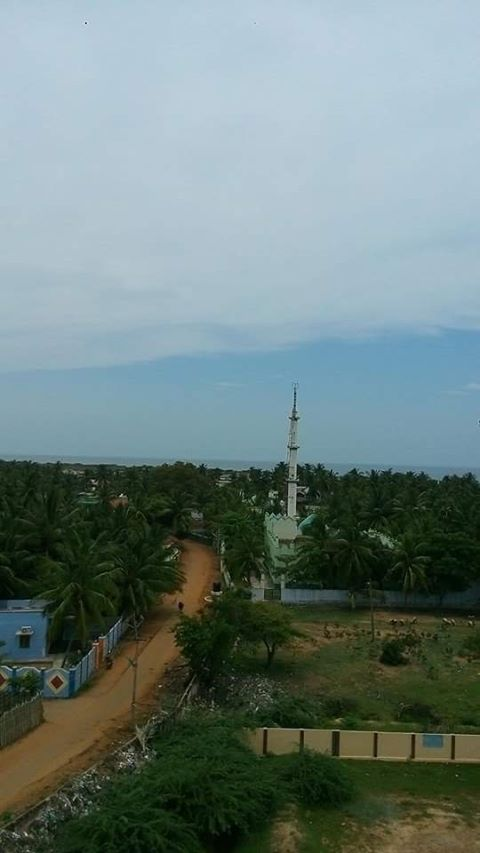
- Aerial view

- Location in Tamil Nadu, India
- Coordinates: 10.19°N 79.24°E
- Country: India
- State: Tamil Nadu
- District: Thanjavur

Population (2011)
  - Total: 3,500

Languages
  - Official: Tamil
- Time zone: UTC+5:30 (IST)
- PIN: 614612
- Telephone code: 91 4373
- Vehicle registration: TN 49
- Website: senthalainews.in

Senthalaivayal is a village located on East Coast Road along the Bay of Bengal in Peravurani Taluk, Thanjavur District, Tamil Nadu, India.

Senthalaivayal is a gram panchayat of Sethubhavachatram block people often called Senthalai Pattinam. It is a coastal village.

Here traditionally fishing is the main source of income.
