= Alamathikkadu =

- village
- Interactive map of Alamathikkadu
- Coordinates: 10.289180°N 79.311102°E
- Country: India
- State: Tamil Nadu
- District: Thanjavur

Population (2001)
  - Total: 651

Languages
  - Official: Tamil
- Time zone: UTC+5:30 (IST)

Alamathikkadu is a village in the Pattukkottai taluk of Thanjavur district, Tamil Nadu, India.

== Demographics ==
As per the 2001 census, Alamathikkadu had a total population of 651 with 310 males and 341 females. The sex ratio was 1100. The literacy rate was 70.27.
