= Vadugankuthagai =

- village
- Country: India
- State: Tamil Nadu
- District: Thanjavur
- Taluk: Pattukkottai

Population (2001)
  - Total: 668

Languages
  - Official: Tamil
- Time zone: UTC+5:30 (IST)

Vadugankuthagai is a revenue village under Alathur, Thanjavur panchayat in the Pattukkottai taluk of Thanjavur district, Tamil Nadu, India.

== Demographics ==
As per the 2001 census, Vadugankuthagai had a total population of 668 with 347 males and 321 females. The sex ratio was 925. The literacy rate was 65.61.
