= K. Mahendran (IYC) =

K. Mahendran K. மகேந்திரன்

Personal details
- Born: Thamarankottai, Pattukottai, Thanjavur District
- Party: Indian National Congress

K Mahendran (Tamil: க. மகேந்திரன்) is a young Indian politician and contested as a candidate of Congress party for the post of MLA in Tamil Nadu Assembly Election 2016 from pattukkottai constituency. He is one of the secretaries of national committee of Indian Youth Congress.
