= K. Bashyam =

Indian freedom fighter and artist (1907-1999)

- Born: 26 January 1907
- Died: 1999 (aged 91–92)
- Other name: Arya
- Relatives: N. Gopalaswami Ayyangar (uncle)

K. Bashyam (26 January 1907 – 1999), also known by his pen name Arya, was an Indian freedom fighter and artist who participated in the Indian independence movement and later contributed to the field of art.

== Early life ==
Bashyam was born on 26 January 1907 to Kuppuswami Ayyangar and Shenbaga Lakshmi Amma in Serangulam.

== Contribution in Indian independence movement ==
His early engagement with the Indian independence movement began in 1919 when he attended a meeting opposing the Jallianwala Bagh massacre. He was influenced by Mahatma Gandhi’s non-cooperation movement in 1921 and later became involved in the student boycott of the Simon Commission in 1928, which led to his expulsion from college and a monetary fine.

Following his expulsion, Bashyam became more deeply involved in the independence movement. Initially drawn to revolutionary activities, he was part of a group planning targeted actions against British officials, though these plans were ultimately not executed. In 1931, he joined the Indian National Congress and engaged in non-violent protest activities, including picketing foreign cloth shops and toddy shops and advocating the use of khadi.

Bashyam’s political activities were not well-received by his aristocratic family. His uncle, N. Gopalaswami Ayyangar, was a prominent figure in the Madras Civil Service, later serving as Dewan of Kashmir and Railway Minister of independent India.

On 26 January 1932, Bashyam gained recognition for hoisting the Congress flag atop the wireless broadcasting pole at Fort St. George in Madras (now Chennai), an act of defiance against British rule during the period of intensified government repression following Gandhi’s declaration of Independence Day. This act led to his arrest and imprisonment, during which he met Subhas Chandra Bose.

== Career ==
After his release, Bashyam transitioned to a career in art, establishing The United Arts in 1945. A self-taught artist, he created portraits of significant figures, including Mahatma Gandhi, and British officials such as Lord Harris, the Duke of Wellington, and Sir Eyre Coote. His work extended to political cartoons and illustrations, which he published under the pen name "Arya".

Bashyam is also credited with creating one of the best-known depictions of the poet Subramania Bharati, featuring the poet with a handlebar moustache and a turban. This oil-on-canvas portrait, painted in 1950, measures 176 x 124 cm and remains an iconic representation of the poet. He sculpted busts and statues of prominent figures, including Mahatma Gandhi, one of which is located at Thakkar Bapa Vidyalaya in Chennai. His statue of S. Satyamurti stands at Ripon Building in Chennai.

Bashyam was legally challenged in the case Associated Publishers (Madras) Ltd. vs K. Bashyam alias 'Arya'. The court ruled that a portrait of Mahatma Gandhi created by Bashyam, based on two photographs, was entitled to copyright. The decision affirmed that his portrait was sufficiently distinct from the photographs and met the criteria of originality.

== Death and legacy ==
K. Bashyam died in 1999. Bashyam refused to accept the pension doled out to freedom fighters after Independence.

In recognition of his contributions, the Tamil Nadu government, under Karunanidhi, installed and inaugurated a bust of Bashyam on 17 July 1999 at the Gandhi Mandapam complex in Guindy. On the same occasion, Karunanidhi declared 17 July as Martyrs' Day on behalf of the Tamil Nadu government. This day is celebrated annually to honor the sacrifices of freedom fighters like Bashyam.

A special cover commemorating Bashyam was released on 13 August 2022 during the Sipa Amritpex 2022 event held in Chennai.
