= Sendankadu =

Sendangadu
- village
- Country: India
- State: Tamil Nadu
- District: Thanjavur
- Taluk: Pattukkottai

Population (2001)
  - Total: 2,116

Languages
  - Official: Tamil
- Time zone: UTC+5:30 (IST)

Sendankadu is a village in the Pattukkottai taluk of Thanjavur district, Tamil Nadu, India.

== Demographics ==
As per the 2001 census, Sendankadu had a total population of 3248 with 1564 males and 1684 females. The sex ratio was 1077. The literacy rate was 70.11.
