= Ettupulikkadu =

Ettupulikkadu Ettivayal
- village
- Interactive map of Ettupulikkadu
- Country: India
- State: Tamil Nadu
- District: Thanjavur

Population (2001)
  - Total: 1,663

Languages
  - Official: Tamil
- Time zone: UTC+5:30 (IST)

Ettupulikkadu is a village in the Pattukkottai taluk of Thanjavur district, Tamil Nadu, India.

== Demographics ==
As per the 2001 census, Ettupulikkadu had a total population of 1663 with 828 males and 835 females. The sex ratio was 1008. The literacy rate was 59.33.
