= Chatramthokkalikadu =

- village
- Country: India
- State: Tamil Nadu
- District: Thanjavur

Population (2001)
  - Total: 900

Languages
  - Official: Tamil
- Time zone: UTC+5:30 (IST)

Chatramthokkalikadu is a village in the Pattukkottai taluk of Thanjavur district, Tamil Nadu, India.

== Demographics ==
At the 2001 census, Chatramthokkalikadu had a total population of 900 with 438 males and 462 females. The sex ratio was 1055. The literacy rate was 65.01%.
