= Balareguramasamudram =

- village
- Country: India
- State: Tamil Nadu
- District: Thanjavur

Population (2001)
  - Total: 346

Languages
  - Official: Tamil
- Time zone: UTC+5:30 (IST)

Balareguramasamudram is a village in the Pattukkottai taluk of Thanjavur district, Tamil Nadu, India.

== Demographics ==
As per the 2001 census, Balareguramasamudram had a total population of 346 with 165 males and 181 females. The sex ratio was 1097. The literacy rate was 78.9.
