= Soorappallam =

- Village
- Location in Tamil Nadu, India Soorappallam (India)
- Coordinates: 10.43°N 79.32°E
- Country: India
- State: Tamil Nadu
- District: Thanjavur
- Taluk: Pattukkottai
- Elevation: 5 m (16 ft)

Population (2021)
  - Total: 2,573

Languages
  - Official: Tamil
- Time zone: UTC+5:30 (IST)
- PIN: 614601
- Telephone code: 91 4373
- Vehicle registration: TN 49
- Sex ratio: 1080 F for 1000 M ♂/♀

Soorappallam is a village located 1 km away from Pattukkottai town in Thanjavur district in Tamil Nadu state in India on the way to Mannargudi and Kumbakonam via Vadaseri.

Soorappallam, a part of Pattukkottai taluk, is most fertile as the land is with rich content of alluvial soil, deposited by the river flowing across the region through Kallanai canal which is one of the distributaries for the Cauvery river.

== Population ==
In this village, The total population is 2573 as per the census operation in 2011 of which 1237 are male & 1336 are female, 8.58% of the population (221 persons of which 101 are Male & 120 are female) are in the age group of 0–6. Soorappallam is one of the villages in the country in which female-male (1080–1000) ratio is higher.

== Education ==
In this village, The literacy rate is 72.71%(with a nominal increase of 2.13% over a decade) against the national literacy rate of 65.38% and state literacy rate of 73.47%.

== Employment ==
In this village, historically, the main occupation has been cultivation, and it provides employment for most of the people as the water resource is available either by Bore-Well pumps or water flowing in the Cauvery river as this village lies in the tail-end area of the delta region formed by the cauvery river and other water resources that includes a great lake and many ponds. The crops cultivated here are groundnut, sesame, coconut, black gram, maize, sugarcane and banana tree while the main crop is paddy (rice). But nowadays, it is evident that the importance for the agriculture goes on decreasing due to many factors. Some of them are rain deficiency, not receiving water in time from mettur dam, not getting the affordable price for the yielded grains, and soaring labour cost. Many village youngsters have been leaving for and working in many foreign countries such as US, UK, Singapore, Malaysia, and Middle East etc. as they claim this is the best way to earn a large amount of money in very short time that easily outweighs the revenue in agriculture.

== Climate ==
As basically India is a tropical country, This village is very hot in summer season (April–July) and the rainy season lies in three months from October to December. As this village is located in Tanjore district, a coastal district in Tamil Nadu state, this village receives about 80% of total annual rainfall in rainy season. Thanks to the North-East monsoon blowing from the Bay of Bengal. The Bay of Bengal is just 14 km (8.7 mi) from this village in Adirampattinam town.
