= Poovanam =

- Village
- Location in Tamil Nadu, India Poovanam (India)
- Coordinates: 10.35°N 79.27°E
- Country: India
- State: Tamil Nadu
- District: Thanjavur
- Taluk: Pattukkottai

Government
  - Type: Village Panchayat

Population (2001)
  - Total: 1,582

Languages
  - Official: Tamil
- Time zone: UTC+5:30 (IST)
- PIN: 614803
- Telephone code: 91 4373 278
- Vehicle registration: TN 49
- Sex ratio: 1079 ♂/♀

Poovanam is a village in the Pattukkottai taluk of Thanjavur district, Tamil Nadu, India, in the southern part of the district in the Cauvery delta.

== Geography ==
Poovanam is located at 10.21°N 79.16°E in the Cauvery delta on the southeast coast of India in east-central Tamil Nadu, 12 kilometers from Pattukkottai and 60 kilometers from Thanjavur.

== Demographics ==
As per the 2001 census, Poovanam had a total population of 1582 with 761 males and 821 females. The sex ratio was 1079. The literacy rate was 63.31.
