= Mohur (village) =

Mohur (village) Mohur
- village
- Country: India
- State: Tamil Nadu
- District: Thanjavur
- Taluk: Pattukkottai

Population (2001)
  - Total: 881

Languages
  - Official: Tamil
- Time zone: UTC+5:30 (IST)

Mohur is a village in the Pattukkottai taluk of Thanjavur district, Tamil Nadu, India.

== Demographics ==
As per the 2001 census, Mohur had a total population of 881 with 452 males and 429 females. The sex ratio was 949. The literacy rate was 67.36.
