= Mudalcheri =

- village
- Interactive map of Mudalcheri
- Coordinates: 10°23′59″N 79°19′55″E
- Country: India
- State: Tamil Nadu
- District: Thanjavur
- Taluk: Pattukkottai

Government
  - Panchayat President: Mrs rosamaal yogopu

Population (2001)
  - Total: 2,216

Languages
  - Official: Tamil
- Time zone: UTC+5:30 (IST)

Mudalcheri is a village in the Pattukkottai taluk of Thanjavur district, Tamil Nadu, India.

== Demographics ==
As per the 2001 census, Mudalcheri had a total population of 2216 with 1100 males and 1116 females. The sex ratio was 1015. The literacy rate was 73.42.
