= Ennaivayal =

- village
- Location in Tamil Nadu, India
- Coordinates: 10°23′06″N 79°15′48″E
- Country: India
- State: Tamil Nadu
- District: Thanjavur

Population (2001)
  - Total: 438

Languages
  - Official: Tamil
- Time zone: UTC+5:30 (IST)

Ennaivayal is a village in the Pattukkottai taluk of Thanjavur district, Tamil Nadu, India.

== Demographics ==
As per the 2001 census, Ennaivayal had a total population of 438 with 205 males and 233 females. The sex ratio was 1137. The literacy rate was 57.49.
