= Soundaranayakipuram =

Coordinates: 10°21′45″N 79°24′40″E

- village
- Interactive map of Soundaranayakipuram
- Country: India
- State: Tamil Nadu
- District: Thanjavur
- Taluk: Pattukkottai

Population (2001)
  - Total: 1,341

Languages
  - Official: Tamil
- Time zone: UTC+5:30 (IST)

Soundaranayakipuram is a village in the Pattukkottai taluk of Thanjavur district, Tamil Nadu, India.

== Demographics ==
As per the 2001 census, Soundaranayakipuram had a total population of 1341 with 632 males and 709 females. The sex ratio was 1/1.22. The literacy rate was 63.64.
