= Reguramasamudram =

Coordinates: 10°26′18″N 79°28′38″E

- village
- Interactive map of Reguramasamudram
- Country: India
- State: Tamil Nadu
- District: Thanjavur
- Taluk: Pattukkottai

Population (2001)
  - Total: 316

Languages
  - Official: Tamil
- Time zone: UTC+5:30 (IST)

Reguramasamudram is a village in the Pattukkottai taluk of Thanjavur district, Tamil Nadu, India.

== Demographics ==
As per the 2001 census, Reguramasamudram had a total population of 316 with 146 males and 170 females. The sex ratio was 1164. The literacy rate was 74.39.
