= Vadiakkadu =

- village
- Country: India
- State: Tamil Nadu
- District: Thanjavur
- Taluk: Pattukkottai

Population (2001)
  - Total: 591

Languages
  - Official: Tamil
- Time zone: UTC+5:30 (IST)

Vadiakkadu is a village in the Pattukkottai taluk of Thanjavur district, Tamil Nadu, India.

== Demographics ==
As per the 2001 census, Vadiakkadu had a total population of 591 with 278 males and 313 females. The sex ratio was 1126. The literacy rate was 67.64.
