= Sukkiranpatti =

- village
- Country: India
- State: Tamil Nadu
- District: Thanjavur
- Taluk: Pattukkottai
- Region: Chola Nadu
- Zone: Cauvery Delta

Population (2001)
  - Total: 1,592

Languages
  - Official: Tamil
- Time zone: UTC+5:30 (IST)

Sukkiranpatti is a village in the Pattukkottai taluk of Thanjavur district, Tamil Nadu, India.

== Demographics ==
As per the 2001 census, Sukkiranpatti had a total population of 1592 with 789 males and 803 females. The sex ratio was 1018. The literacy rate was 64.12.
