= Chokkanavur =

Coordinates: 10°29′N 79°28′E

- village
- Interactive map of Chokkanavur
- Country: India
- State: Tamil Nadu
- District: Thanjavur

Population (2001)
  - Total: 1,295

Languages
  - Official: Tamil
- Time zone: UTC+5:30 (IST)

Chokkanavur is a village in the Pattukkottai taluk of Thanjavur district, Tamil Nadu, India.

== Demographics ==
As per the 2001 census, Chokkanavur had a total population of 1295 with 637 males and 658 females. The sex ratio was 1033. The literacy rate was 69.
