= Alaginayagipuram =

- village
- Interactive map of Alaginayagipuram
- Coordinates: 10.310814°N 79.308142°E
- Country: India
- State: Tamil Nadu
- District: Thanjavur

Population (2001)
  - Total: 633

Languages
  - Official: Tamil
- Time zone: UTC+5:30 (IST)

Alaginayagipuram is a village in the Pattukkottai taluk of Thanjavur district, Tamil Nadu, India.

== Demographics ==
As per the 2001 census, Alaginayagipuram had a total population of 633 with 303 males and 330 females. The sex ratio was 1.089. The literacy rate was 73.2.
