= Naduvikurichi =

- village
- Country: India
- State: Tamil Nadu
- District: Thanjavur
- Taluk: Pattukkottai

Population (2001)
  - Total: 467

Languages
  - Official: Tamil
- Time zone: UTC+5:30 (IST)

Naduvikurichi is a village in the Pattukkottai taluk of Thanjavur district, Tamil Nadu, India.

== Demographics ==
As per the 2001 census, Naduvikurichi had a total population of 467 with 223 males and 244 females. The sex ratio was 1094. The literacy rate was 79.91.
