= Andikkadu =

Coordinates: 10°19′N 79°19′E

Andikkadu Andikkadu farming village
- village
- Interactive map of Andikkadu
- Country: India
- State: Tamil Nadu
- District: Thanjavur

Population (2001)
  - Total: 1,271

Languages
  - Official: Tamil
- Time zone: UTC+5:30 (IST)

Andikkadu is a village in the Pattukkottai taluk of Thanjavur district, Tamil Nadu, India. Famous advocate Mr.R.Balasubramanian better known as R.B. was born here. Mr.R.Srinivasa Iyer who was M.L.A. Of Pattukottai from 1957 to 1962 belongs to Andikadu; Mr.R.Krishnamurthy Iyer, who was a famous Mirasdar cum philanthropist also belongs to this area. They are brothers.

== Demographics ==
As per the 2001 census, Andikkadu had a total population of 1271 with 653 males and 618 females. The sex ratio was 946. The literacy rate was 78.
