= Kalichankkottai =

Kalichankkottai Kalichankottai
- village
- Location in Tamil Nadu, India Kalichankkottai (India)
- Coordinates: 10°30′35″N 79°27′30″E
- Country: India
- State: Tamil Nadu
- District: Thanjavur

Government
  - Panchayat President: Vemparasi Tamilarasan

Population (2019)
  - Total: 650

Languages
  - Official: Tamil
- Time zone: UTC+5:30 (IST)
- Postal code: 614905

Kalichankkottai is a village in the Pattukkottai taluk of Thanjavur district, Tamil Nadu, India.

== Demographics ==
As per the 2001 census, Kalichankkottai had a total population of 384 with 184 males and 200 females. The sex ratio was 1087. The literacy rate was 82.65.
