= Pillankuli =

Coordinates: 10°24′N 79°16′E

- village
- Interactive map of Pillankuli
- Country: India
- State: Tamil Nadu
- District: Thanjavur
- Taluk: Pattukkottai

Population (2001)
  - Total: 574

Languages
  - Official: Tamil
- Time zone: UTC+5:30 (IST)

Pillankuli is a village in the Pattukkottai taluk of Thanjavur district, Tamil Nadu, India.

== Demographics ==
As per the 2001 census, Pillankuli had a total population of 574 with 277 males and 297 females. The sex ratio was 1072. The literacy rate was 62.96.
