= Palliodiaivayal =

- village
- Country: India
- State: Tamil Nadu
- District: Thanjavur
- Taluk: Pattukkottai

Population (2001)
  - Total: 441

Languages
  - Official: Tamil
- Time zone: UTC+5:30 (IST)

Palliodiaivayal is a village in the Pattukkottai taluk of Thanjavur district, Tamil Nadu, India.

== Demographics ==
As per the 2001 census, Palliodiaivayal had a total population of 441, with 213 males and 228 females. The sex ratio was 1070, while the literacy rate was 66.64.
