= Ottankadu =

- village
- Interactive map of Ottankadu
- Coordinates: 10°20′49″N 79°14′17″E
- Country: India
- State: Tamil Nadu
- District: Thanjavur
- Taluk: Pattukkottai

Population (2001)
  - Total: 3,289

Languages
  - Official: Tamil
- Time zone: UTC+5:30 (IST)

Ottankadu is a village in the Pattukkottai taluk of Thanjavur district, Tamil Nadu, India.

== Demographics ==
As per the 2001 census, Ottankadu had a total population of 3289 with 1624 males and 1665 females. The sex ratio was 1025. The literacy rate was 64.92.
