= Udayamudaiyan =

Coordinates: 10°19′N 79°19′E

- village
- Interactive map of Udayamudaiyan
- Country: India
- State: Tamil Nadu
- District: Thanjavur
- Taluk: Pattukkottai

Population (2001)
  - Total: 528

Languages
  - Official: Tamil
- Time zone: UTC+5:30 (IST)

Udayamudaiyan is a village in the Pattukkottai taluk of Thanjavur district, Tamil Nadu, India.

== Demographics ==
As per the 2001 census, Udayamudaiyan had a total population of 528 with 241 males and 287 females. The sex ratio was 1191. The literacy rate was 65.61.
