= Palayee Agraharam =

- village
- Country: India
- State: Tamil Nadu
- District: Thanjavur
- Taluk: Pattukkottai

Population (2001)
  - Total: 580

Languages
  - Official: Tamil
- Time zone: UTC+5:30 (IST)

Palayee Agraharam is a village in the Pattukkottai taluk of Thanjavur district, Tamil Nadu, India.

== Demographics ==
As per the 2001 census, Palayee Agraharam had a total population of 580 with 285 males and 295 females. The sex ratio was 1035. The literacy rate was 76.42.
