= Vellivayal =

Coordinates: 13°14′N 80°15′E

- village
- Interactive map of Vellivayal
- Country: India
- State: Tamil Nadu
- District: Thanjavur
- Taluk: Pattukkottai

Population (2001)
  - Total: 612

Languages
  - Official: Tamil
- Time zone: UTC+5:30 (IST)

Vellivayal is a village in the Pattukkottai taluk of Thanjavur district, Tamil Nadu, India.

== Demographics ==
As per the 2001 census, Vellivayal had a total population of 612 with 304 males and 308 females. The sex ratio was 1013. The literacy rate was 72.9.
