= Sembalur =

- village
- Interactive map of Sembalur
- Country: India
- State: Tamil Nadu
- District: Thanjavur
- Taluk: Pattukkottai

Population (2011)
  - Total: 1,175

Languages
- Time zone: UTC+5:30 (IST)
- Postal code: 614901

Sembalur is a village in the Pattukkottai taluk of Thanjavur district, Tamil Nadu, India. As per the 2011 Census, Sembalur had a total population of 1,175, with 541 males and 634 females, and a literacy rate of 69.39%.
