= Poovalur, Thanjavur district =

Poovalur
- village
- Country: India
- State: Tamil Nadu
- District: Thanjavur
- Taluk: Pattukkottai

Population (2001)
  - Total: 1,335

Languages
  - Official: Tamil
- Time zone: UTC+5:30 (IST)

Poovalur is a village in the Pattukkottai taluk of Thanjavur district, Tamil Nadu, India.

== Demographics ==
As per the 2001 census, Poovalur had a total population of 1335 with 640 males and 695 females. The sex ratio was 1086. The literacy rate was 66.7.
