= Eanathi =

Enathi
- village
- Interactive map of Enathi
- Coordinates: 10°27′54″N 79°16′34″E
- Country: India
- State: Tamil Nadu
- District: Thanjavur

Population (2001)
  - Total: 3,089

Languages
  - Official: Tamil
- Time zone: UTC+5:30 (IST)
- PIN: 614615
- Website: https://enathi.com

Enathi is a village in the Pattukkottai taluk of Thanjavur district, Tamil Nadu, India.

== Schools ==
Panchayat Union Primary School and Government High School

== Demographics ==
As per the 2001 census, Eanathi had a population of 3089 with 1485 males and 1554 females. The literacy rate was 67.97%.
