= Madampattavur =

Mathanmpattavur
- village
- Interactive map of Mathanmpattavur
- Coordinates: 10.361872°N 79.245258°E
- Country: India
- State: Tamil Nadu
- District: Thanjavur
- Taluk: Pattukkottai

Population (2001)
  - Total: 1,523

Languages
  - Official: Tamil
- Time zone: UTC+5:30 (IST)

Madampattavur is a village in the Pattukkottai taluk of Thanjavur district, Tamil Nadu

== Demographics ==
As per the 2001 census, Mathanpattavur had a total population of 608 with 289 males and 319 females. The sex ratio was 1104. The literacy rate was 54.86.
