= Veerakurichi =

- village
- Interactive map of Veerakurichi
- Country: India
- State: Tamil Nadu
- District: Thanjavur
- Taluk: Pattukkottai

Population (2001)
  - Total: 1,927

Languages
  - Official: Tamil
- Time zone: UTC+5:30 (IST)

Veerakurichi is a village in the Pattukkottai taluk of Thanjavur district, Tamil Nadu, India.

== Demographics ==
As per the 2001 census, Veerakurichi had a total population of 1927 with 940 males and 987 females. The sex ratio was 1050. The literacy rate was 64.78.
