= Aladikkadu =

Coordinates: 10°20′N 79°18′E

Andikkadu
- village
- Interactive map of Andikkadu
- Country: India
- State: Tamil Nadu
- District: Thanjavur

Population (2001)
  - Total: 777

Languages
  - Official: Tamil
- Time zone: UTC+5:30 (IST)

Andikkadu is a village in the Pattukkottai taluk of Thanjavur district, Tamil Nadu, India.

== Demographics ==
As per the 2001 census, Aladikkadu had a total population of 777 with 389 males and 388 females. The sex ratio was 997. The literacy rate was 65.89%.
