= Santhankadu =

- village
- Country: India
- State: Tamil Nadu
- District: Thanjavur
- Taluk: Pattukkottai

Population (2001)
  - Total: 2,003

Languages
  - Official: Tamil
- Time zone: UTC+5:30 (IST)
- Postal code: 614615
- Vehicle registration: TN 49

Santhankadu is a village in the Pattukkottai taluk of Thanjavur district, Tamil Nadu, India.

== Demographics ==
As per the 2001 census, Santhankadu had a total population of 2003 with 985 males and 1018 females. The sex ratio was 1034. The literacy rate was 73.75.
