= Neivaviduthi =

- village
- Country: India
- State: Tamil Nadu
- District: Thanjavur
- Taluk: Pattukkottai

Population (2001)
  - Total: 351

Languages
  - Official: Tamil
- Time zone: UTC+5:30 (IST)

Neivaviduthi is a village in the Pattukkottai taluk of Thanjavur district,614602 Tamil Nadu, India.

== Demographics ==
As per the 2001 census, Neivaviduthi had a total population of 351 with 159 males and 192 females. The sex ratio was 1208. The literacy rate was 68.88.
