= Kallivayal =

- village
- Country: India
- State: Tamil Nadu
- District: Thanjavur

Population (2001)
  - Total: 677

Languages
  - Official: Tamil
- Time zone: UTC+5:30 (IST)

Kallivayal is a village in the Pattukkottai taluk of Thanjavur district, Tamil Nadu, India.

== Demographics ==
As per the 2001 census, Kallivayal had a total population of 677 with 344 males and 333 females. The sex ratio was 968. The literacy rate was 62.37.
