= Nainankulam =

- village
- Country: India
- State: Tamil Nadu
- District: Thanjavur
- Taluk: Pattukkottai

Population (2001)
  - Total: 647

Languages
  - Official: Tamil
- Time zone: UTC+5:30 (IST)

Nainankulam is a village in the Pattukkottai taluk of Thanjavur district, Tamil Nadu, India.

== Demographics ==
As per the 2001 census, Nainankulam had a total population of 647 with 339 males and 308 females. The sex ratio was 909 females per 1000 males. The literacy rate was 76.41.
