= Thokkalikkadu =

Thokkalikadu
- village
- Country: India
- State: Tamil Nadu
- District: Thanjavur
- Taluk: Pattukkottai

Population (2011)
  - Total: 1,694

Languages
  - Official: Tamil
- Time zone: UTC+5:30 (IST)

Thokkalikkadu is a village in the Pattukkottai taluk of Thanjavur district, Tamil Nadu, India.

== Demographics ==
As per the 2011 census, Thokkalikkadu had a total population of 1694 with 844 males and 850 females. In 2001, the sex ratio was 1075. The literacy rate was 69.91.
