= Ponkundu =

- village
- Country: India
- State: Tamil Nadu
- District: Thanjavur
- Taluk: Pattukkottai

Population (2001)
  - Total: 708

Languages
  - Official: Tamil
- Time zone: UTC+5:30 (IST)

Ponkundu is a village in the Pattukkottai taluk of Thanjavur district, Tamil Nadu, India.

== Demographics ==
As per the 2001 census, Ponkundu had a total population of 708 with 331 males and 377 females. The sex ratio was 1139. The literacy rate was 74.92.
