= Pannaivayal =

Coordinates: 10°23′N 79°17′E

- village
- Interactive map of Pannaivayal
- Country: India
- State: Tamil Nadu
- District: Thanjavur
- Taluk: Pattukkottai

Population (2001)
  - Total: 1,604

Languages
  - Official: Tamil
- Time zone: UTC+5:30 (IST)
- Vehicle registration: TN49

Pannaivayal is a village in the Pattukkottai taluk of Thanjavur district, Tamil Nadu, India.

== Demographics ==
As per the 2001 census, Pannaivayal had a total population of 1604 with 812 males and 792 females. The sex ratio was 975. The literacy rate was 70.31.
