= Kotthadivayal =

Koothadivayal
- village
- Koothadivayal
- Country: India
- State: Tamil Nadu
- District: Thanjavur
- Taluk: Pattukkottai

Population (2001)
  - Total: 301

Languages
  - Official: Tamil
- Time zone: UTC+5:30 (IST)

Koothadivayal is a village in the Pattukkottai taluk of Thanjavur district, Tamil Nadu, India.

== Demographics ==
As per the 2001 census, Kotthadivayal had a total population of 301 with 152 males and 149 females. The sex ratio was 980. The literacy rate was 77.27.
