= K.Unjiyaviduthi =

- village
- Country: India
- State: Tamil Nadu
- District: Thanjavur

Languages
  - Official: Tamil
- Time zone: UTC+5:30 (IST)
- Telephone code: 91-4373

K. Unjiyaviduthi (Kattathi Unjiyaviduthi) is a village in the Pattukkottai taluk of Thanjavur district, Tamil Nadu, India.

School: K. Unjiyaviduthi has a Middle school up to 10th standard.
