= Eduthanivayal =

- village
- Country: India
- State: Tamil Nadu
- District: Thanjavur

Population (2001)
  - Total: 345

Languages
  - Official: Tamil
- Time zone: UTC+5:30 (IST)

Eduthanivayal is a village in the Pattukkottai taluk of Thanjavur district, Tamil Nadu, India.

== Demographics ==
As per the 2001 census, Eduthanivayal had a total population of 345 with 174 males and 171 females. The sex ratio was 983. The literacy rate was 52.4.
