= Eripurakarai =

- village
- Country: India
- State: Tamil Nadu
- District: Thanjavur

Population (2001)
  - Total: 3,437

Languages
  - Official: Tamil
- Time zone: UTC+5:30 (IST)

Eripurakarai is a village in the Pattukkottai Taluk of Thanjavur district, Tamil Nadu, India.

== Demographics ==
As per the 2001 census, Eripurakarai had a total population of 3437 with 1651 males and 1786 females. The sex ratio was 1082. The literacy rate was 67.96.
