= Maravanvayal =

- village
- Interactive map of Maravanvayal
- Coordinates: 10°17′58″N 79°17′57″E
- Country: India
- State: Tamil Nadu
- District: Thanjavur
- Taluk: Pattukkottai

Population (2001)
  - Total: 209

Languages
  - Official: Tamil
- Time zone: UTC+5:30 (IST)

Maravanvayal is a village in the Pattukkottai taluk of Thanjavur district, Tamil Nadu, India.

== Demographics ==
As per the 2001 census, Maravanvayal had a total population of 209 with 104 males and 105 females. The sex ratio was 1010. The literacy rate was 53.67.
