= Karisavayal =

- village
- Country: India
- State: Tamil Nadu
- District: Thanjavur

Population (2001)
  - Total: 1,205

Languages
  - Official: Tamil
- Time zone: UTC+5:30 (IST)

Karisavayal is a village in the Pattukkottai taluk of Thanjavur district, Tamil Nadu, India. There is a Government High School IN Karisavayal. Telephone Exchange under the name Karisavayal was located at a kilometer cooperated karisavayal Border. A well cooperated Hindus and Muslims live together. Social worker are Karisavayal Islamic association and Lions Group Friends.

== Demographics ==
At the 2001 census, Karisavayal had a total population of 1205 with 590 males and 615 females.
