= Thennankudi =

Settlement in India

Thennangudi is a medium-size village in Peravurani Taluk, Thanjavur district, Tamil Nadu, India. With many coconut farms, each with a house attached, the main product of this village is coconut. The two Kalabairavar temple is famous for astami pooja and sangu pooja and yuthrayagam. The Sri Kala Bairavar Temple is in the village. The Cauvery sub river runs through the village and has three ponds, two small and one with a surface area of ten acres. At the bus facility from 6AM to 11pm the #5 bus from Pattukottai to Peravurani runs continuously. Kalathur Kalakam Mavadukuruchi and Otangadu are near the village.

== Demographics ==
The population of Thennangudi village is just 887, as per 2011 Census of India. The male population is 424 and female population is 463. The literacy rate of Thennankudi is 78.14%.
