= Karagavayal =

- village
- Location in Tamil Nadu, India
- Coordinates: 10.382962°N 79.305762°E
- Country: India
- State: Tamil Nadu
- District: Thanjavur

Population (2001)
  - Total: 1,769

Languages
  - Official: Tamil
- Time zone: UTC+5:30 (IST)

Karagavayal is a village in the Pattukkottai taluk of Thanjavur district, Tamil Nadu, India.

== Demographics ==
As per the 2001 census, Karagavayal had a total population of 1769 with 863 males and 906 females. The sex ratio was 1050. The literacy rate was 81.75.
