= Manavayal =

Coordinates: 11°33′N 76°28′E

- village
- Interactive map of Manavayal
- Country: India
- State: Tamil Nadu
- District: Thanjavur
- Taluk: Pattukkottai

Population (2011)
  - Total: 545

Languages
  - Official: Tamil
- Time zone: UTC+5:30 (IST)

Manavayal is a village in the Pattukkottai taluk of Thanjavur district, Tamil Nadu, India.

== Demographics ==
As per the 2011 census, Manavayal had a total population of 545. As of the preceding census in 2001, Manavayal had a total population of 516 with 249 males and 267 females. The sex ratio was 1.072. The literacy rate was 63.03.
