= Veppankkadu =

- village
- Country: India
- State: Tamil Nadu
- District: Tanjore
- Taluk: Pattukkottai taluk

Population (2001)
  - Total: 964

Languages
  - Official: Tamil
- Time zone: UTC+5:30 (IST)
- pincode: 614615

Veppankkadu is a village in the Pattukkottai taluk of Thanjavur district, Tamil Nadu, India.

== Demographics ==
As per the 2001 census, Veppankkadu had a total population of 964 with 470 males and 494 females. The sex ratio was 1051. The literacy rate was 66.78.
