= Arasalamkarambai =

Coordinates: 10.3271383°N 79.1542358°E

Arasalamkarambai is a very small village in Peravurani taluk, Thanjavur district, Tamil Nadu, India. Total geographical area of the village is 320.98 hectares.

== Demographics ==
Arasalamkarambai has only two families residing in it. The total population of the village is 5 only. 3 males and 2 females are residing here. The literacy rate is 75%: the male rate is 50% and that for females is 100%.
