= Eralivayal =

Coordinates: 10°19′N 79°18′E

- village
- Interactive map of Eralivayal
- Country: India
- State: Tamil Nadu
- District: Thanjavur

Population (2001)
  - Total: 359

Languages
  - Official: Tamil
- Time zone: UTC+5:30 (IST)

Eralivayal is a village in the Pattukkottai taluk of Thanjavur district, Tamil Nadu, India.

== Demographics ==
As per the 2001 census, Eralivayal had a total population of 359 with 187 males and 172 females. The sex ratio was 920. The literacy rate was 72.52.
