= Marudangavayal =

Coordinates: 10°19′N 79°20′E

- village
- Interactive map of Marudangavayal
- Country: India
- State: Tamil Nadu
- District: Thanjavur
- Taluk: Pattukkottai

Population (2001)
  - Total: 454

Languages
  - Official: Tamil
- Time zone: UTC+5:30 (IST)
- Postal code: 614701

Marudangavayal is a village in the Pattukkottai taluk of Thanjavur district, Tamil Nadu, India.

== Demographics ==
As per the 2001 census, Marudangavayal had a total population of 454 with 231 males and 223 females. The sex ratio was 965. The literacy rate was 79.1.
