= Palamuthi =

- village
- Country: India
- State: Tamil Nadu
- District: Thanjavur
- Taluk: Pattukkottai

Population (2001)
  - Total: 1,226

Languages
  - Official: Tamil
- Time zone: UTC+5:30 (IST)
- Postal code: 614615

Palamuthi is a village in the Pattukkottai taluk of Thanjavur district, Tamil Nadu, India.

The primary school goes up to 5th standard and the government high school goes up to 10th standard class.

== Demographics ==
As per the 2001 census, Palamuthi had a total population of 1226 with 581 males and 645 females. The sex ratio was 1110. The literacy rate was 67.54.
