= Kalugapulikkadu =

- village
- Country: India
- State: Tamil Nadu
- District: Thanjavur

Population (2001)
  - Total: 1,958

Languages
  - Official: Tamil
- Time zone: UTC+5:30 (IST)

Kalugapulikkadu is a village in the Pattukkottai taluk of Thanjavur district, Tamil Nadu, India.

== Demographics ==
As per the 2001 census, Kalugapulikkadu had a total population of 1958 with 987 males and 971 females. The sex ratio was 984. The literacy rate was 66.51.
