= Naduvikkottai =

- village
- Nicknames: NKT, Naduvai
- Country: India
- State: Tamil Nadu
- District: Thanjavur
- Taluk: Pattukkottai

Population (2001)
  - Total: 2,995

Languages
  - Official: Tamil
- Time zone: UTC+5:30 (IST)

Naduvikkottai is a village in the Pattukkottai taluk of Thanjavur district, Tamil Nadu, India. Naduvikkottai has mostly educated people's. Each and every family's had master's degree holders, also most of them are highly educated and worked in various central and state government departments. There are two elementary schools; one has up to 5th standard and the other has SSLC school. Mostly all students are from villages around Naduvikkottai.that village was normal bus facilities and 1 hr one time bus

Most of the people are working in Singapore and Bangalore and chennai. After SSLC they are going to pattukottai for their higher studies. It comes under peravurani constituency. Now current MLA is Mr.govindaraj from AIADMK.

== Demographics ==
As per the 2001 census, Naduvikkottai had a total population of 2995 with 1439 males and 1556 females. The sex ratio was 1081. The literacy rate was 68.58.
