= Kullukkadu =

- village
- Country: India
- State: Tamil Nadu
- District: Thanjavur
- Taluk: Pattukkottai

Population (2001)
  - Total: 1,899

Languages
  - Official: Tamil
- Time zone: UTC+5:30 (IST)

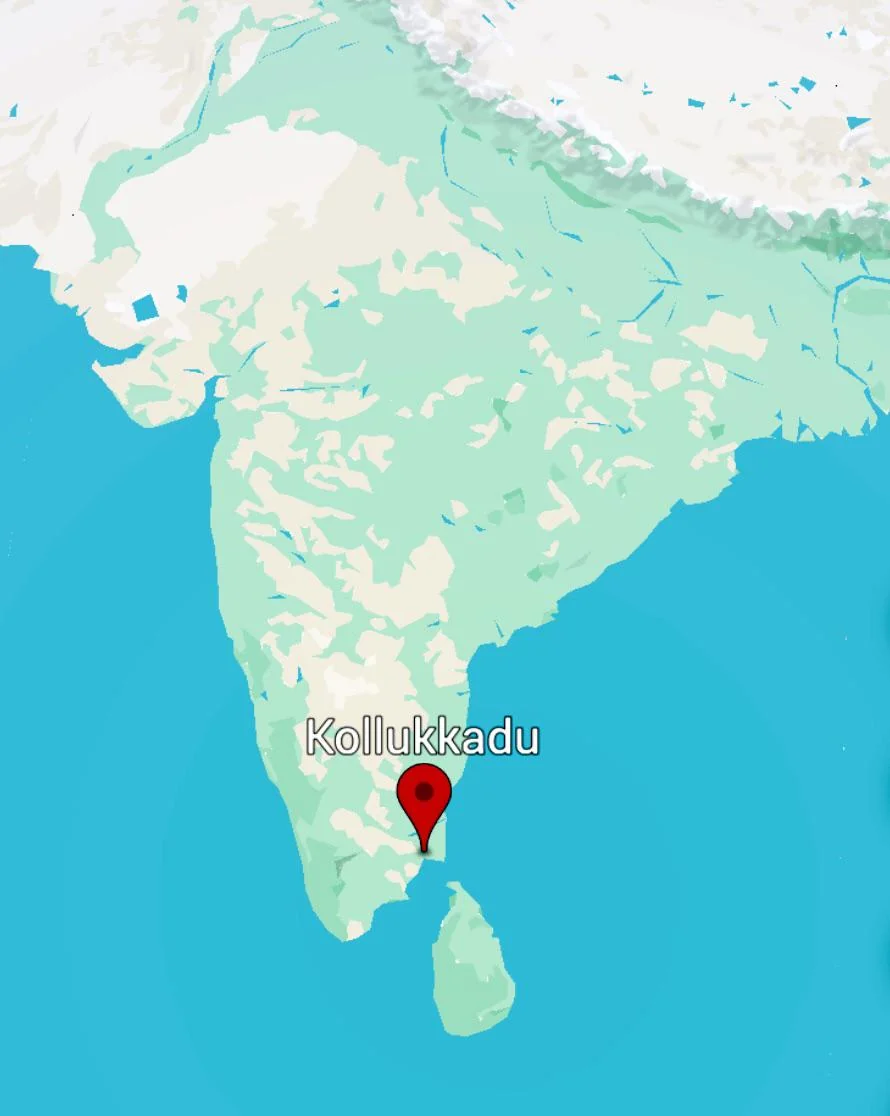

Kullukkadu is a village in the Pattukkottai taluk of Thanjavur district, Tamil Nadu, India.

== Demographics ==
As per the 2001 census, Kullukkadu had a total population of 1899 with 951 males and 948 females. The sex ratio was 997. The literacy rate was 72.95%.
