= Kuruvikkarambai =

- village
- Kuruvikkarambai Post: India
- State: Tamil Nadu
- District: Thanjavur
- Taluk: Peravurani

Government
  - Panchayat President: Vairavan S

Population (2001)
  - Total: 1,136

Tamil
  - Official: Tamil
- Time zone: UTC+5:30 (IST)
- Postal code: 614802
- Vehicle registration: Pattukottai /TN 49

Kuruvikkarambai is a village in Peravurani Taluk in the Thanjavur District of Tamil Nadu State, India. It is located 68 km south of the district headquarters in Thanjavur, 5 km from Sethubavachatram, and 383 km from the state capital, Chennai.குருவிக்கரம்பை பதினொன்று நாட்டு உறவின் முறையினர் பிற சமுதாயத்தினருக்கு எடுத்துக்காட்டாக வாழ்ந்தனர் என்பதற்கு அவர்களால் நமக்கு விட்டு செல்லப்பட்டிருக்கன்ற சமுதாய அமைப்பிலே உள்ள கரைகளும், வாழ்வியல் சடங்குகளும், நடைமுறை பழக்க வழக்கங்களும், திருக்கோயில் சக்தி வழிபாட்டு நடைமுறைகளுமே இன்றளவும் சான்றாக விளங்கி வருகின்றன. அருள்மிகு முத்துமாரியம்மன் திருக்கோயில் இன்றைக்கு சற்றொப்ப 250ஆண்டுகளுக்கு முன்னர் குருவிக்கரம்பையில் வாழ்ந்த அகமுடையார் சமுதாயத்தைச் சேர்ந்த ஆறு குடும்பத்தினர்கள் தெய்வ வழிபாட்டிற்கும் இதன்மூலமாக ஒற்றுமையாகவும் பரஸ்பரமாகவும், கட்டுக்கோப்பாகவும் வாழ்ந்திடலுக்குமாகவும் நிர்மாணிக்கப்பட்டது தான் அன்னை அருள்மிகு முத்துமாரியம்மன் திருக்கோயில். இந்த ஆறு குடும்பங்களைச் சார்ந்த குடும்பத்தலைவர்கள், தலைவர்கள் என்ற முறையில் வேலையின்பாற்பட்டு சுழற்சி முறையில் மேற்படி திருக்கோயிலின் அறங்காவலர்களாக இருந்துவந்து, திருக்கோயில் நிர்வாகம் சம்பந்தப்பட்ட அனைத்துப் பணிகளையும் நிர்வகித்து வந்துள்ளனர். இந்நிலை இன்றளவும் தொடர்கிறது. மேற்சொல்லப்பட்ட ஆறு குடும்பங்களைச் சேர்ந்தவர்களும், அவர்களினது வழித்தோன்றல்களும் முறையே தோண்டித்தேவர், தானத்தேவர், பள்ளித்தேவர், நயினாங்குட்டித்தேவர், சேர்வைக்காரர், பெரமதேவர் ஆகிய ஆறு கரைகளுக்குள் அடங்குவர். 2004ஆம் ஆண்டில் ஆவிச்சித்தேவர் என்ற புதியதொரு ஏழாவது கரை உருவாக்கப்பட்டு அது முதற்கொண்டு குருவிக்கரம்பைக் கிராம ஏழு கரைதாரர்கள் என்றழைக்கப்படுகின்றனர். அவ்வகையில் குருவிக்கரம்பைத் தாய்க் கிராமமும் அதன் பிடாகைக் கிராமங்களான வாத்தலைக்காடு, மருங்கப்பள்ளம், நாடாகாடு, கள்ளங்காடு, குண்டாமரைக்காடு, பாலச்சேரிக்காடு, கோட்டைக்காடு, முனுமாக்காடு, விளக்கு வெட்டிக்காடு, கொல்லங்கரம்பை, ஓமக்காடு, கரம்பக்காடு, தேனாங்காடு, பூங்குடிக்காடு, சாந்தாம்பேட்டை, கஞ்சங்காடு, வாவிளான்வயல் ஆகிய பதினெட்டிலும் உள்ள அகமுடையார் சமுதாயத்தின் வழிபாட்டுக்காக (சற்றொப்ப 250 ஆண்டுகளுக்கு முன்னர்) அருள்மிகு முத்துமாரியம்மன் திருக்கோயில் நிர்மாணிக்கப் பெற்றது. இவர்களால் ஆண்டுதோறும் சித்திரைப் புத்தாண்டு பாலாபிஷேக பூச்சொரிதல் மற்றும் நித்திய, வார, மாத, வருட ஏறுபடி விழாக்கள் அருள்மிகு முத்துமாரியம்மன் திருக்கோயிலில் நடத்தப்பட்டு வரப்படுகிறது. ஒவ்வொரு தமிழாண்டு பங்குனி மாதம் மூன்றாவது வார திங்கட்கிழமையில் அருள்மிகு அரசடி செல்வ விநாயகர் கோயிலில் நண்பகல் வழிபாட்டுடன், அன்றுமாலை அருள்மிகு அய்யனார், மெய்யப்ப சுவாமி, செல்லப்ப சுவாமி ஆகிய பரிவார மூர்த்திகளுக்கு, கரைதாரர்கள் மற்றும் பொதுமக்கள் பொங்கலிட்டு வழிபாடுகள் செய்வதும், மேற்படி பொங்கல் நாளில் பிறந்த வீட்டிலிருந்து புகுந்த வீட்டு உறவின்முறைக் கிராமங்களில் வாழ்க்கைப்பட்டுள்ள பெண்களும் அதே பொங்கல் நாளில் திருக்கோயிலுக்கு வருகைதந்து பொங்கலிட்டு படையல் வழிபாட்டு நிகழ்வுகளில் கலந்து கொள்வதென்பது வழிபாட்டோடு நண்பர்களையும் உறவினர்களையும் சந்தித்துக் கொள்வதன் மூலம் இது ஒரு காμம் பொங்கலாகவும் அமைகின்றது. பொங்கல் வழிபாடுகள் நிறைவு பெறுகின்ற நேரத்தில் (இரவு 9.30மணியளவில்) கரம்பக்குடியில் இருந்து 25க்கும் மேற்பட்ட முகம்மதிய சமுதாயத்தைச் சேர்ந்தவர்கள் மலர் மாலைகளுடன் திருக்கோயிலுக்கு வருகை தந்து வழிபாடு செய்வதும், கோயில் மரியாதைகளைப் பெற்றுச் செல்வதும் தொடர்ந்து வருகின்ற நடைமுறையாகும். அருள்மிகு மெய்யப்பசுவாமி திருக்கோயிலில் சுதை வடிவில் ராவுத்தர் சுவாமி எழுந்தருளியிருப்பது இங்கு நினைவு கூறத்தக்கது என்பதுடன் மத நல்லிணக்கத்திற்கு எடுத்துக்காட்டாகவும் இது அமைகின்றது. குருவிக்கரம்பையும் அதன் பிடாகைக் கிராமங்கள் பதினேழும் இன்று குருவிக்கரம்பைகரம் பக்காடு- வாத்தலைக்காடு- மருங்கப்பள்ளம்-கெங்காதரபுரம் ஆகிய ஊராட்சிகளில் அடங்கும். அருள்மிகு முத்துமாரியம்மன் திருக்கோயில் குருவிக்கரம்பையும் அதனைச் சேர்ந்த பிடாகைக் கிராமங்கள் பதினேழிலும் வாழ்ந்து வருகின்ற அகமுடையார் சமுதாயத்திற்கு மட்டுமே நிர்வாக பரிபாலனத் திட்டம் செய்து கொள்வதற்கு உரிமையுடையது என தஞ்சாவூர் இந்து சமய அறநிலைய ஆட்சித்துறை இணை ஆணையர் நீதிமன்றம் மூலமாக 24.3.2009இல் தீர்ப்புரை பெறப்பட்டுள்ளது. (திருவள்ளுவராண்டு பங்குனித் திங்கள் 11ஆம் நாள்) இவ்விவரம் தஞ்சாவூர் மாவட்ட அரசிதழ் சிறப்பு வெளியீடு ஆணையின்படி வெளியிடப்பட்டுள்ளது. மருங்கப்பள்ளத்தில் அமைந்ததுள்ள மிகவும் பழமை வாய்ந்த சிவன் கோயில் ஒளசதபுரிஸ்வரர் உலகப் பிரசித்திப்பெற்றது. இக்கோயிலை அடிப்படையாக வைத்துதான் ‘புதையல்’ திரைப்படம் உருவான குறிப்பிடத்தக்கது.

Here, agriculture is the main economic sector of this village.

Kuruvikkarambai is surrounded by Peravurani Taluk, Pattukkottai Taluk, and Karambakudi Taluk to the north, and Arantangi Taluk to the west. It's 5 km near to Bay of Bengal.

== Notable people ==
- The Tamil movie lyricist 'Kuruvikkarambai' Shanmugam is a native of this village.
- Karunas is an Indian Tamil actor, politician, and comedian who hails from this village.
