= Madubashanipuram =

- village
- Country: India
- State: Tamil Nadu
- District: Thanjavur
- Taluk: Pattukkottai

Population (2001)
  - Total: 1,036

Languages
  - Official: Tamil
- Time zone: UTC+5:30 (IST)

Madubashanipuram is a village in the Pattukkottai taluk of Thanjavur district, Tamil Nadu, India.

== Demographics ==
As per the 2001 census, Madubashanipuram had a total population of 1036 with 511 males and 525 females. The sex ratio was 1027. The literacy rate was 60.66.
