= Gopalasamudram, Thanjavur =

Gopalasamudram
- village
- Country: India
- State: Tamil Nadu
- District: Thanjavur

Population (2001)
  - Total: 501

Languages
  - Official: Tamil
- Time zone: UTC+5:30 (IST)

Gopalasamudram is a village in the Pattukkottai taluk of Thanjavur district, Tamil Nadu, India.

== Demographics ==
As per the 2001 census, Gopalasamudram had a total population of 501 with 267 males and 234 females. The sex ratio was 876. The literacy rate was 66.74.
