= Kattaiyankadu =

- village
- Country: India
- State: Tamil Nadu
- District: Thanjavur

Government
  - Panchayat President: M.Vijayarani Manimuthu

Population (2001)
  - Total: 477

Languages
  - Official: Tamil
- Time zone: UTC+5:30 (IST)

Kattaiyankadu is a village in the Pattukkottai taluk of Thanjavur district, Tamil Nadu, India.

== Demographics ==
As per the 2001 census, Kattaiyankadu had a total population of 477 with 226 males and 251 females. The literacy rate was 64.76%.
