= Pookkollai =

- Mannarkudi Municipality
- Location in Tamil Nadu, India
- Coordinates: 10°39′0″N 79°27′0″E
- Country: India
- State: Tamil Nadu
- District: Thiruvarur

Government
  - Body: Taluk Council

Languages
  - Official: Tamil
- Time zone: UTC+5:30 (IST)
- PIN: 614802
- Telephone code: 04372
- Vehicle registration: TN 49 Z
- Coastline: 0 kilometres (0 mi)
- Nearest city: Mannarkudi
- Lok Sabha constituency: Thanjavur
- Civic agency: Thaluk Council

Pookkollai is a town in the southern area of Mannargudi, in the Indian state of Tamil Nadu. It is relatively a bigger area in the peravurani represented by two ward presidents in the panchayat body.

== Etymology ==
"Poo" in Tamil means flower. "Kollai" in Tamil means garden or backyard. It is widely believed that the word Pookkollai came from the fact the flowers for entire of town of Peravurani and nearby villages were supplied from Pookkollai.

== Importance ==
There are big bore wells deployed in Pookkollai due to higher mineral content and lower salt content in ground water. More than 75% of the water of the entire town is fulfilled by Pookkollai. Pookkollai falls under southern area of Peravurani which is the gateway of Peravurani for the nearby villages whose inhabitants primarily control the politics of Peravurani. Most of the politicians dwell in Pookkollai and it makes it a posh area having higher real estate values.

== Important streets ==
- Sethu Road
- Bye-pass Road
- Mariyamman kovil Nagar
- Pillaiyar kovil Nagar
- Big Street
- Pookkollai 4road

== Important schools ==
- Panchayat Union Primary School
- Panchayat Union Kindergarten

== Banks ==
- Indian Overseas Bank
