= Sri Malaiperumal Koil =

Temple in Alathur, Tamil Nadu, India

Malaiperumal Temple, also popularly known as Arut Chiththar Temple, is located at Alathur village of Nagapattinam district, Tamil Nadu. This temple was built over the Samadhi of a famous saint of Tamil Nadu, known as Malaiperumal Swamigal.

== History ==
The construction of the temple started by the initiative taken by the local villagers, when the Siththar was alive, during the 19th Century. Due to additional funds required to complete the construction, a local businessman, Subba Pillai, travelled to South Africa, and provided additional funds to complete the work. It is said that once he returned from South Africa, the saint, Malaiperumal Siththar attained Samadhi in the temple. Later, a Shiva Lingam was placed over the mausoleum of the saint and worshipped. This idol is still kept intact and worshipped by the Alathur village residents and devotees from around the world.

== Idols in the temple ==
There are other idols in the temple too, including those of Vinayaka, Subramaniya-Valli-Deivayanai, Bhairava, goddess Kamalambika, Chandikeswarar. Also, we can find the Sun God and Shani God placed on a single dais inside the temple. The temple also hosts an idol of Sri Malaiperumal Siththar.

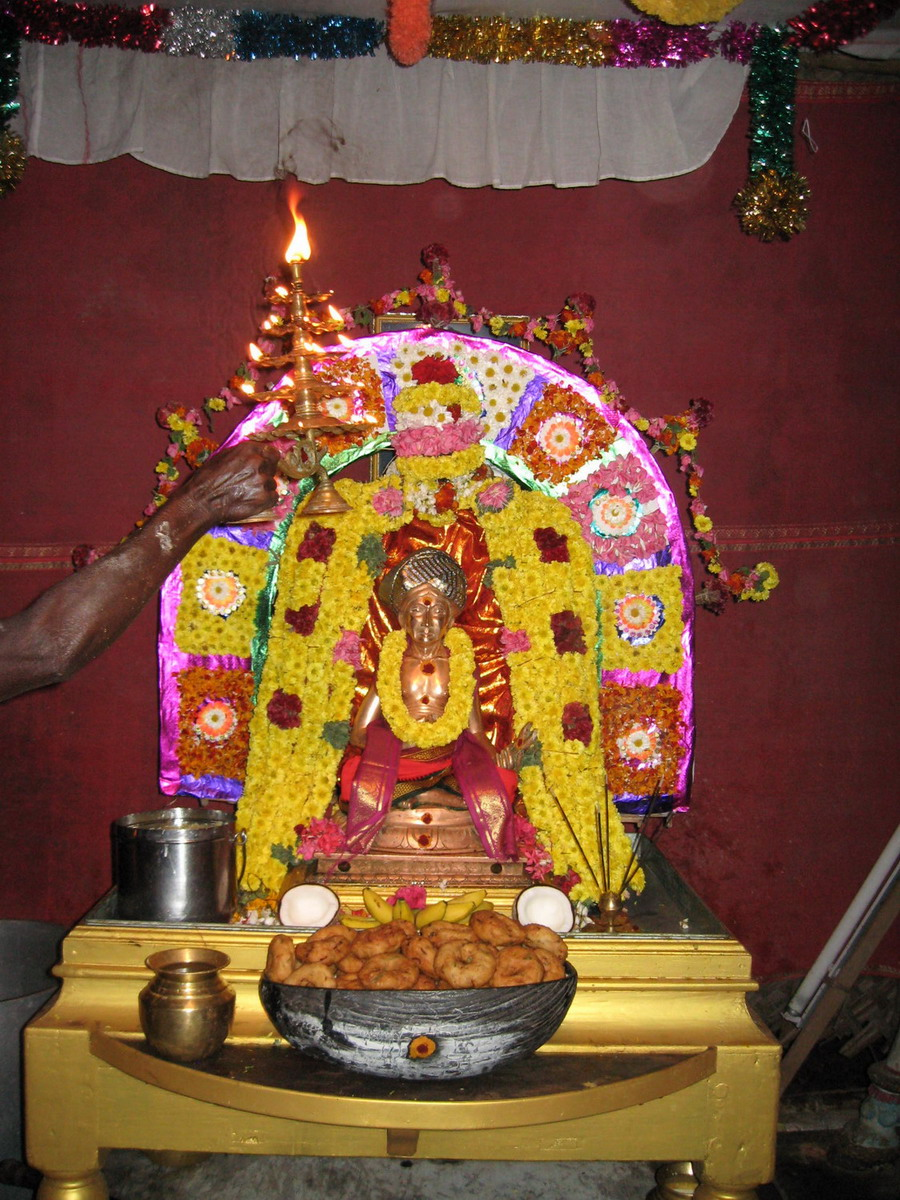
Idol of Sri Malaiperumal Swamy decorated with flowers during the Pournami Pooja organized in January 2009

== Temple Renovations ==
Currently, this temple is going through renovation work with the help of funds flowing from within Tamil Nadu as well as around the world including Japan and Canada.

The renovation work is led by Sri Malaiperumal Koil Trust, 9.Alathur, Nagapattinam - 609 604

One of the main accomplishments of the renovation work is the completion of a meditation hall in which the portrait of Sri Malaiperumal Swamy is placed. This hall can hold around 20 people at a time.

== Festivals ==
Avani Magam
In the Tamil month of Avani, and the day pertaining to the star Magam, a festival commences in the temple and continues for 10 days. During the festival days, special prayers are organized and food is distributed to devotees visiting the temple.

Pournami Pooja
On the full moon day of every month, special prayers are organized in the temple. Around 500 people participate in the event every month.
