= Puliyakudi =

- village
- Country: India
- State: Tamil Nadu
- District: Thanjavur
- Taluk: Pattukkottai

Population (2001)
  - Total: 701

Languages
  - Official: Tamil
- Time zone: UTC+5:30 (IST)

Puliyakudi is a village in the Pattukkottai taluk of Thanjavur district, Tamil Nadu, India.

== Demographics ==
As per the 2011 census, Puliyakudi had a total population of 3,434 with 1,692 males and 1,742 females. The sex ratio was 1030. The literacy rate was 67.29 %.
