= Kurichi, Thanjavur =

Kurichi
- village
- Country: India
- State: Tamil Nadu
- District: Thanjavur
- Taluk: Pattukkottai

Population (2001)
  - Total: 1,523

Languages
  - Official: Tamil
- Time zone: UTC+5:30 (IST)
- Postal code: 614602

Kurichi is a village in the Pattukkottai taluk of Thanjavur district, Tamil Nadu, India.

== Demographics ==
As per the 2001 census, Kurichi had a total population of 1523 with 741 males and 782 females. The sex ratio was 1055. The literacy rate was 75.84.
