= Parakakalakottai =

Parakkalakkottai Thenpothigai Nallur
- village
- Nickname: Paravai
- Location in Tamil Nadu, India
- Coordinates: 10.385416°N 79.433819°E
- Country: India
- State: Tamil Nadu
- District: Thanjavur
- Taluk: Pattukkottai

Government
  - Panchayat President: J.Vinayagam

Population (2001)
  - Total: 1,311

Languages
  - Official: Tamil
- Time zone: UTC+5:30 (IST)
- Postal code: 614613
- Vehicle registration: TN 49

Parakkalakkottai is a village in the Pattukkottai taluk of Thanjavur district, Tamil Nadu, India.

== Demographics ==
As per the 2001 census, Parakkalakkottai had a total population of 1311 with 622 males and 689 females; the sex ratio was 1.108. The literacy rate was 69.81%.
