= Pukkarambai =

Coordinates: 10°20′N 79°17′E

- village
- Interactive map of Pukkarambai
- Country: India
- State: Tamil Nadu
- District: Thanjavur
- Taluk: Pattukkottai

Population (2001)
  - Total: 2,599

Languages
  - Official: Tamil
- Time zone: UTC+5:30 (IST)

Pukkarambai is a village in the Pattukkottai taluk of Thanjavur district, Tamil Nadu, India.

== Demographics ==
As per the 2001 census, Pukkarambai had a total population of 2599 with 1252 males and 1347 females. The sex ratio was 1076. The literacy rate was 61.86.
