= Kollukkadu =

- village
- Country: India
- State: Tamil Nadu
- District: Thanjavur

Population (2001)
  - Total: 1,804

Languages
  - Official: Tamil
- Time zone: UTC+5:30 (IST)

Kollukkadu is a village in the Pattukkottai taluk of Thanjavur district, Tamil Nadu, India.

== Demographics ==
As per the 2001 census, Kollaikkadu had a total population of 1804 with 920 males and 884 females. The sex ratio was 961. The literacy rate was 72.88.
