= Thuravikkadu =

- village
- Country: India
- State: Tamil Nadu
- District: Thanjavur
- Taluk: Pattukkottai

Population (2001)
  - Total: 3,071

Languages
  - Official: Tamil
- Time zone: UTC+5:30 (IST)

Thuravikkadu is a village in the Pattukkottai taluk of Thanjavur district, Tamil Nadu, India.

== Demographics ==
As per the 2001 census, Thuravikkadu had a total population of 3071 with 1534 males and 1537 females. The sex ratio was 1002. The literacy rate was 70.63.
