= Kondikulam =

Coordinates: 10°25′N 79°17′E

- village
- Interactive map of Kondikulam
- Country: India
- State: Tamil Nadu
- District: Thanjavur
- Taluk: Pattukkottai

Population (2001)
  - Total: 1,532

Languages
  - Official: Tamil
- Time zone: UTC+5:30 (IST)

Kondikulam is a village in the Pattukkottai taluk of Thanjavur district, Tamil Nadu, India.

== Demographics ==
Er.selvakumar. marine engg.and youth congress leader Kondikulam
