= Enathi =

- village
- Location in Tamil Nadu, India
- Coordinates: 9.327392°N 78.472595°E
- Country: India
- State: Tamil Nadu
- District: Ramanathapuram
- Elevation: 70 m (230 ft)

Population (2002)
  - Total: 1,991

Languages
  - Official: Tamil
- Time zone: UTC+5:30 (IST)
- PIN: 623704
- Telephone code: 4576
- Vehicle registration: TN 65

Enathi is a village in Tamil Nadu, India, located in India The village has many temples, such as Boongulam, Ancheneya, Kali, and some Vinayagar and Ayyanar. Kabaddi is a popular game in the village, and a number of well-known players are from here.

Enathi village is known for having many cultural activities. Veera Pandiya Kattabomman and Harichnadra dramas are periodically staged and acted by village locals during festivals. Village cultural activities include oyilattam for men, and kummi for both men and women.

The village contains one bank, the Primary Agriculture Cooperative Bank. The nearby village's Chitrangudi Bird Sanctuary is popular.

The saintly devotees of Shiva are known as Nayanmar or Nayanar). There are 63 of them, one of them from this village is called "Enathi natha nayanar".

The climate of Karisal Kaadu is semi-arid, with hot and dry summers. Both the temperature and humidity are usually high; the village is close to the equator and 25 km (16 miles) from the coast.

== Geography ==
The village of Enathi has an average elevation of 10 m (33 ft). The Vinayagar and Ayyanar Swamy Temple occupies the major area of Enathi.

== Schools ==
- Anjaneya Matriculation School
- Government primary school

== Business ==
The majority of the population works in agriculture; commercial activity in the area is also related to this.

== Politics ==
Enathi is part of Ramanathapuram (Lok Sabha Constituency) and the Mudukulathur Assembly Constitution.
