= Nambivayal =

Coordinates: 10°29′N 79°15′E

- Village
- Interactive map of Nambivayal
- Country: India
- State: Tamil Nadu
- District: Thanjavur
- Taluk: Pattukkottai

Population (2001)
  - Total: 2,200

Languages
  - Official: Tamil
- Time zone: UTC+5:30 (IST)
- Postal code: 614615
- Vehicle registration: TN 49

Nambivayal is a village in the Pattukkottai taluk of Thanjavur district, Tamil Nadu, India.

== Demographics ==
As per the 2001 census, Nambivayal had a total population of 2200 with 1086 males and 1114 females. The sex ratio was 1026. The literacy rate was 71.74.
