= Keeramangalam =

- town
- Location in Tamil Nadu, India
- Coordinates: 10°18′9″N 79°5′11″E
- Country: India
- State: Tamil Nadu
- District: Pudukkottai

Population (2011)
  - Total: 9,357

Languages
  - Official: Tamil
- Time zone: UTC+5:30 (IST)
- Postal code: 614624

Keeramangalam is a panchayat town in Pudukkottai District in the Indian state of Tamil Nadu.

It is located in Alangudi taluk.

81 feet statue of Meinindranaadha swami(Lord Shiva) & 7.25 feet statue of the chief poet "Nakkeerar" are situated at Meinindranaadha swami Temple, Keeramangalam, which is near to Keeramangalam bus stand.

The original name of the village is said to be Nakeerarmangalam named after the great Tamil chief poet "Nakkeerar".

== Demographics ==
As of 2011 India census, Keeramangalam had a population of 9360. Males constitute 50% of the population and females 50%. Keeramangalam has an average literacy rate of 74%, higher than the national average of 59.5%: male literacy is 82%, and female literacy is 66%. In Keeramangalam, 10% of the population is under 6 years of age.
