= Rendampulikadu =

Coordinates: 10.2925°N 79.3042°E

- village
- Interactive map of Rendampulikadu
- Country: India
- State: Tamil Nadu
- District: Thanjavur
- Taluk: Pattukkottai

Population (2001)
  - Total: 1,115

Languages
  - Official: Tamil
- Time zone: UTC+5:30 (IST)

Rendampulikadu is a village in the Pattukkottai taluk of Thanjavur district, Tamil Nadu, India.

== Demographics ==
As per the 2001 census, Rendampulikadu had a total population of 1115 with 572 males and 543 females. The sex ratio was 949. The literacy rate was 69.82.
