= Pallathur, Thanjavur district =

Pallathur
- village
- Interactive map of Pallathur
- Coordinates: 10.331676°N 79.315572°E
- Country: India
- State: Tamil Nadu
- District: Thanjavur
- Taluk: Pattukkottai

Population (2017)
  - Total: 2,546

Languages
  - Official: Tamil
- Time zone: UTC+5:30 (IST)

Pallathur is a village in the Pattukkottai taluk of Thanjavur district, Tamil Nadu, India.

== Demographics ==
As per the 2001 census, Pallathur had a total population of 1947 with 934 males and 1013 females. The sex ratio was 1085. The literacy rate was 73.15.

It was previously accorded in Pattukkottai State Assembly Constituency, now it is accorded in Peravurani State Assembly Constituency due to this change some dramatic changes happened in 2011 election
