= Aladikkumulai =

Coordinates: 10.450622°N 79.306065°E

Aladikkumulai Thamaraikkudikkadu
- village
- Nickname: Aladi
- Interactive map of Aladikkumulai
- Country: India
- State: Tamil Nadu
- District: Thanjavur

Government
  - Type: Village panchayat
  - Panchayat President: P. Surya

Languages
  - Official: Tamil
- Time zone: UTC+5:30 (IST)
- Postal code: 614 615
- Website: www.aladikkumulai.blogspot.com

Aladikkumulai is a village located in Pattukkottai Taluk, Thanjavur district, Tamil Nadu, India. It is one of the best environmental village in the thanjavur district and the village people are various communities, Veerakodi Vellalar and Nadar, Devar, Ambalakarar, Yadava, Adi Dravida, Muslims and Christians are live in this village. It is located very near the Pattukkottai town. It is sparsely populated. The village contains a pond called 'Thamarai Kulam', which is most beautiful with the growth of lotus. The village has a government primary and high school. Also has a private school named 'Brindhavan Higher Secondary School'. The other name for this village is 'Thamaraikkudikaadu'(தாமரைக்குடிகாடு).

Most of the residents are educated. Agriculture used to be the main occupation, but this has declined in popularity, possibly due to lack of water and reduced profitability. There is a temple dedicated to Mari Amman for whom a festival is conducted every year.

Other temples located in this village are Sri Muthumariamman, Sri Kaliamman, Sri Nagathamman, Sri Veeranar, Sri Muneeswaran and Sri Vinayagar.

Tamil is the official language and is predominantly spoken. English is widely understood in the village area. Both languages are widely used for various purposes such as commerce, in the village.
