= Ponnavarayankottai =

- Village
- Interactive map of Ponnavarayankottai
- Coordinates: 10°25′N 79°20′E
- Country: India
- State: Tamil Nadu
- District: Thanjavur
- Taluk: Pattukkottai

Area
  - Total: 0.863 km^{2} (0.333 sq mi)

Population (2011)
  - Total: 982
  - Density: 1,140/km^{2} (2,950/sq mi)

Languages
  - Official: Tamil
- Time zone: UTC+5:30 (IST)

Ponnavarayankottai is a village in the Pattukkottai Taluk of Thanjavur District, Tamil Nadu, India. The closest neighboring town is Pattukkottai, about 1 km away.

== Demographics ==
As of the 2011 census, Ponnavarayankottai had a total population of approximately 982, consisting of 473 males and 509 females. The gender ratio of the village was 0.987, and its literacy rate was 73.45% (according to 2001 census data). Ponnavarayankottai is home to Ponnai Vadakku Street, Kaliy Amman Koil Street, Karuppaiah Koil Street, and Muthupettai Road Street. There are 258 independent households in Ponnavarayankottai, including another village, Ponnavarayankottai Ukkadai, in the Ponnavarayankottai gram panchayat.

The population in the surrounding areas is ultimately native to Ponnavarayankottai.

In the village's early days, the Ponnavarayankottai village consi.

== Infrastructure ==
Ponnavarayankottai has a public and private bus service, as well as a railway system within 5 kilometers of most residents.

Ponnavarayankottai village has four pools, two rivers, and various agricultural lands. These agrarian aspects lend to the village an excellent location for farmers and for populations to flourish.
