= Pudupattinam, Pattukkottai taluk =

Puduppattinam
- Village
- Country: India
- State: Tamil Nadu
- District: Thanjavur
- Taluk: Pattukkottai

Government
  - Panchayat President: Ameer mohideen. S
  - Rank: 1

Population (2011)
  - Total: 3,500

Languages
  - Official: Tamil
- Time zone: UTC+5:30 (IST)
- Postal code: 614701
- Vehicle registration: TN 49

Pudupattinam is a village in the Pattukkottai taluk of Thanjavur district in the Indian state of Tamil Nadu.

== Geography ==
Pudupattinam is located 50 km from the district capital Thanjavur, 19 km from Pattukkottai and 328 km away from the state capital, Chennai. It covers an area of 1.39 km^{2}.

== Demographics ==
According to the 2011 population census, the village has a population of 2,109 It includes 425 households. It has a literacy rate of 86.5% (91% among males and 82% among females), which is higher than the average literacy rate of Tamil Nadu (80%). The population density is 579 per km^{2}.
