= Madathikkadu =

- village
- Interactive map of Madathikkadu
- Coordinates: 10.371968°N 79.197174°E
- Country: India
- State: Tamil Nadu
- District: Thanjavur
- Taluk: Pattukkottai

Population (2001)
  - Total: 1,601

Languages
  - Official: Tamil
- Time zone: UTC+5:30 (IST)

Madathikkadu is a village in the Pattukkottai taluk of Thanjavur district, Tamil Nadu, India.

== Demographics ==
As per the 2001 census, Madathikkadu had a total population of 1601 with 828 males and 773 females. The sex ratio was 934. The literacy rate was 74.02.
