= Chokkanathapuram, Thanjavur =

Chokkanathapuram
- village
- Interactive map of Chokkanathapuram
- Coordinates: 10.342366°N 79.304302°E
- Country: India
- State: Tamil Nadu
- District: Thanjavur

Population (2001)
  - Total: 2,127

Languages
  - Official: Tamil
- Time zone: UTC+5:30 (IST)

Chokkanathapuram is a village in the Pattukkottai taluk of Thanjavur district, Tamil Nadu, India.

== Demographics ==
As per the 2001 census, Chokkanathapuram had a total population of 2127 with 1031 males and 1096 females. The sex ratio was 1063. The literacy rate was 69.62.
