= Palathali =

- village
- Country: India
- State: Tamil Nadu
- District: Thanjavur
- Taluk: Pattukkottai

Population (2001)
  - Total: 510

Languages
  - Official: Tamil
- Time zone: UTC+5:30 (IST)

Palathali is a village in the Pattukkottai taluk of Thanjavur district, Tamil Nadu, India. It is also known as "Durkkai Amman Kovil" due to the temple which is located there. Agriculture is the main activity, which is extensively done in "muppogam" (முப்போகம் ) three times a year. This place depends on "Kaveri" river water and borewells for farming rice. Rice cultivation is the main agricultural activity. Many people go abroad for work.

== Demographics ==
As per the 2001 census, Palathali had a total population of 510 with 251 males and 259 females. The sex ratio was 1032. The literacy rate was 76.82%.
