= Veerayankottai =

Veeriyankottai
- Village
- Country: India
- State: Tamil Nadu
- District: Thanjavur
- Taluk: Peravurani

Government
  - Type: Tamilnadu Assembly
  - Body: Village Panchayat
- Elevation: 28 m (92 ft)

Population
  - Total: 1,350
- Time zone: UTC+5:30 (IST)
- Postal code: 614802
- Vehicle registration: TN 49
- Website: www.wikipedia.com/veeriyankottai

Veeriyankottai is a village in Peravurani Taluk in Thanjavur District of Tamil Nadu, India. It is located 71 km towards south from District headquarters Thanjavur, 4 km from Sethubavachatram, 6 km from Peravurani, 387 km from State capital Chennai, and 100 km from Tiruchirappalli.

Udayanadu ( 2 km ), Kalanivasal ( 2 km ), Nadiyam ( 3 km ), Kuruvikkarambai ( 4 km ), Marakkavalasai ( 4 km ), Vilangulam ( 5 km ) are the nearby Villages to Veeriyankottai.

Veeriyankottai is surrounded by Peravurani Taluk towards North, Pattukkottai Taluk towards North, Arantangi Taluk towards west, Manalmelkudi Taluk towards south .Peravurani, Pattukkottai, Pudukkottai, and Karaikudi are the nearby cities to Veeraiyankottai. It is near to bay of Bengal. There is a chance of humidity in the weather.

Veeriyankottai is located in the UTC 5.30 time zone and it follows Indian standard time(IST). Veeriyankottai sunrise time varies 13 minutes from IST.

== Education ==
=== Nearby colleges ===
- Anna University (Pattukkottai Campus), Ecr Road, Rajamadam- 614701
- Manora Polytechnic College, Kambayan Kanni Main Road, Kotakudi, Pattukkottai - Tk., Thanjavur - Dt.
- Sri Vengadesvara Arts and Science (Women), Peravurani -614804
- Dr. Kalam Polytchnic College, Avanam, Peravurani tk
- Govt Arts and Science, Kalainger Nagar, Mudachikadu(po), Peravurani(tk), Thanjavur -614804

=== Nearby schools ===
- Atlantic International School, Kulithalai-Sethubavachathiram Highway, Veeriyankottai, Peravurani (tk), Thanjavur -614802
- Muvendar Matric Higher Secondary School, Muvendar nagar, Sengamangalam, Peravurani (tk), Thanjavur -614804
- Govt. Boys Higher Secondary School, Peravurani
- Govt. Girls Higher Secondary School, Peravurani
- August Zion Nursery and Primary School, Peravurani
- Govt. High school, Udaiyanadu, Peravurani tk
- Rajarajan Primary & Nursery School, Veeriyankottai -Udaiyanadu
- Sri Venkateswara CBSE School, Peravurani
- Dr. J.C. Kumarappa Centenary Vidya Mandir, Peravurani
- Kalaimagal Higher Secondary School, Thiruchitrambalam, Peravurani tk
- Veerappa Matric and Higher Secondary School, Peravurani
- GHSS, Pallathur, Sethubavachatram, Thanjavur, Tamil Nadu . PIN- 614803
- GHS- Mallipattinam - Sarapenthira Rajanpattinam, Sethubavachatram, Thanjavur, Tamil Nadu . PIN- 614723, Post - Mallipattinam
- GHSS - Perumagalur - Perumagaloure (south), Sethubavachatram, Thanjavur, Tamil Nadu . PIN- 614612
- GHSS - Kuruvikkarambai, Peravurani

== Transport ==
- Veeriyankottai bus stop
- Kaikatti Bus Stop
- Buses from Peravurani to Pattukottai or Sethubavachatiram (stopping at Kaikatti)

PR-10 (Sri Balaji Transport), CRC-10, AKN, HMT, Thillainayagi, ARK, Raahath, Rahim, Trichy-Adirampattinam Govt Bus, LST.

- Buses from Peravurani to Veeriyankottai (stopping at Veeriyankottai)

A-1, A-11, Ibrahim (mini bus), Thangaraja (gold king), Sakthimurugan, Malar, KTP.

== Nearby theatre ==
- Aathi Muthu saroja theatre - Peravurani,

== Hotels ==
- Sowbagyamani Lodge, Peravurani .
- STD residency, Peravurani .
- CV lodge, Peravurani .

== Nearby hospitals ==
- Government Hospital - Udayanadu 6 km
- Apollo Pharmacy 6 km
- Bala nursing home 6 km
- Dharshana hospital 6 km
- Govt hospital peravurani 6 km
- Govt hospital kuruvikkarambai 2 km

== Village statistics ==
| Name of Taluk | Peravurani |
| Population of the village | 11,800 |
| Mode of transportation | Bus |
| Proximity to district (in hours) | 2.5 Hrs |
| Proximity to Taluk (in hours) | 0.45 Hrs |
| Distance of village from district | 65 km |
| Distance of village from RBH | 25 km |
| Names of tributaries in the village | Mettur project |
Occupation and Income Details
| Main occupation of men in the village | Agriculture |
| Main occupation of women in the village | Agriculture |
| Occupation income | Max. Rs64000 and Min. Rs20200 |
Farm source income
| Non-Farm source income | Coconut sales-Rs.75 perday |
| Cost of 1-acre (4,000 m^{2}) of land in the village | Rs.80 Lakhs to Rs.100 Lakhs |
Crop Details
| Types of crop | Coconut, Paddy, Groundnut, Sugarcane |
| Crop Cycles | 4 |
Other Details
| Nearest School and distance | 0.5 km |
| Number of students in the school | 100 |
| Staff strength | 5 |
| No. of clinics | 2 |
| No. of certified Doctors | None |
| Nearest PHC to village | 1 |
| No. of Pharmacy store | 4 |
| Banks nearby: Names and distance | Union Bank of India - Udayanadu, 5 km |
| Banking Products | All |
| Rate of interest charged by moneylenders | 3% |
| Number of self-help groups in village | 20 |
| Cost of 200 square feet (19 m^{2}) shop in the village | Rs.40000 |
| Rent of 200 square feet (19 m^{2}) shop in the village | Rs.800 |
Government schemes offered in the village
| currently | NREGS |
