= Narasingapuram, Pattukkottai taluk =

Narasingapuram
- village
- Country: India
- State: Tamil Nadu
- District: Thanjavur
- Taluk: Pattukkottai

Population (2001)
  - Total: 1,697

Languages
  - Official: Tamil
- Time zone: UTC+5:30 (IST)

Narasingapuram is a village in the Pattukkottai taluk of Thanjavur district, Tamil Nadu, India.

== Demographics ==
As per the 2001 census, Narasingapuram had a total population of 1697 with 861 males and 836 females. The sex ratio was 971. The literacy rate was 61.72.
