= Sethubavachatram =

Coordinates: 10°14′56.3″N 79°16′40.8″E

Sethubavachatram is a coastal village located in Peravurani taluk, Thanjavur district, Tamil Nadu, India, with a population in 2011 of just over 2,000. It is largely a fishing and farming community. The village is home to a government school.
