= Anaikkadu =

Coordinates: 10.3500°N 79.3833°E

- village
- Interactive map of Anaikkadu
- Country: India
- State: Tamil Nadu
- District: Thanjavur

Population (2001)
  - Total: 2,757

Languages
  - Official: Tamil
- Time zone: UTC+5:30 (IST)
- Postal code: 614602
- Vehicle registration: TN 49

Anaikkadu is a village in the Pattukkottai taluk of Thanjavur district, Tamil Nadu, India.

Anaikkadu Uravinmurai Sangam an association of Anaikkadu relatives residing all over the world was registered in Chennai and started in 1987. Now it has more than 10,000 members all over the world. Francis Savior school in Anaikkadu is more than 100 years old. Anaikkadu is a birthplace of many prominent people who excelled in the field of Politics, Movies and Business. Presently there is one Higher secondary school, a Women's training institute, 4 churches and Community center.

== Demographics ==
As per the 2001 census, Anaikkadu had a total population of 2757 with 1356 males and 1401 females. The sex ratio was 1033. The literacy rate was 76.97.
