= Peravurani =

- Town Panchayat in Tamil Nadu
- Nicknames: Coconut Town, Perai
- Location in Tamil Nadu, India
- Coordinates: 10.3°N 79.18°E
- Country: India
- State: Tamil Nadu
- District: Thanjavur
- Established: 04, June 1951
- Named for: Peravurani literally means "Big Pond", which is derived from the Tamil words Periya meaning big and Oorani meaning a Pond

Government
  - Type: Special Grade Town Panchayat
  - Body: Peravurani Town Municipality

Area
  - Total: 18.70 km^{2} (7.22 sq mi)
- Elevation: 16 m (52 ft)

Population
  - Total: 31,200
  - Density: 1,670/km^{2} (4,320/sq mi)
- Time zone: UTC+5:30 (IST)
- PIN: 614804
- Telephone code: 04373
- Vehicle registration: TN-49
- Sex ratio: 961 per 1000 males ♂/♀
- Lok Sabha constituency: Thanjavur

Peravurani is a panchayat town in Thanjavur district in the Indian state of Tamil Nadu. It is the administrative headquarters of the Peravurani Taluk and Peravurani (State Assembly Constituency). It is declared as Special Grade Town Panchayat.

== Geography ==
Peravurani is located at 10.3°N 79.18°E. It has an average elevation of 16 metres (52 feet). This town lies in the new delta region of River Cauvery. This region is irrigated from the water source of Kallanai Kalvai and its distributories.(Canals built by the British to carry water from Grand Anaicut to this region). This area mostly consists of riverine alluvium, red loam, lateritic and black soil types in which the alluvial soil being the predominant type.

Peravurani is about 370 km south of Chennai, the capital of Tamil Nadu. 26 Kilometers North East of Aranthangi and at a distance of 75 Kilometers from Thanjavur. Pattukkottai is the nearest big town at a distance of 30 kilometers from Peravurani on the highway to Thanjavur. In the west side, Pudukkottai town is located at a distance of 51 km. Perumagalur and Keeramangalam are the nearest Town Panchayats to Peravurani.

Temperature in Thanjavur district varies between 37.48 degree Celsius and 20.82 degree Celsius. Rainfall during North East Monsoon varies between 545.7mm and 953.2 mm and during South West Monsoon it varies between 342.0 and 303.1 mm.

=== Demographics ===
Religious census 2011
Religion	Percent(%)
Hindu	83.45%
Muslim	9.98%
Christian	6.52%
Not stated	0.05%

At the 2001 India census, Peravurani has a population of 21045 as per 2001 census and having male population of 10327 and female population of 10718. Males constituted 49% of the population and females 51%. Peravurani has shown a growth rate of 22 percent between 1981 and 1991 whereas it has shown a high growth percentage of 151% between 1991 and 2001 mainly due to increase in its jurisdiction area from 6.8 Sq. km to 18.7 Sq. km. The growth of population and decade variation from the year 1981.

As per the religious census of 2011, Hinduism is majority religion in Peravurani with 83.45% followers. Islam is second most popular religion in town of Peravurani with approximately 9.98% following it. In Peravurani Town, Christianity is followed by 6.52%, Jainism by 0.00%, Sikhism by 0.00% and Buddhism by 0.00%. Around 0.0% stated 'Other Religion', approximately 0.05% stated 'No Particular Religion'.

Historical population
Year	Pop.	±%
1981	6,853	—
1991	8,375	+22.2%
2001	21,045	+151.3%
2011	22,084	+4.9%

== Economy ==
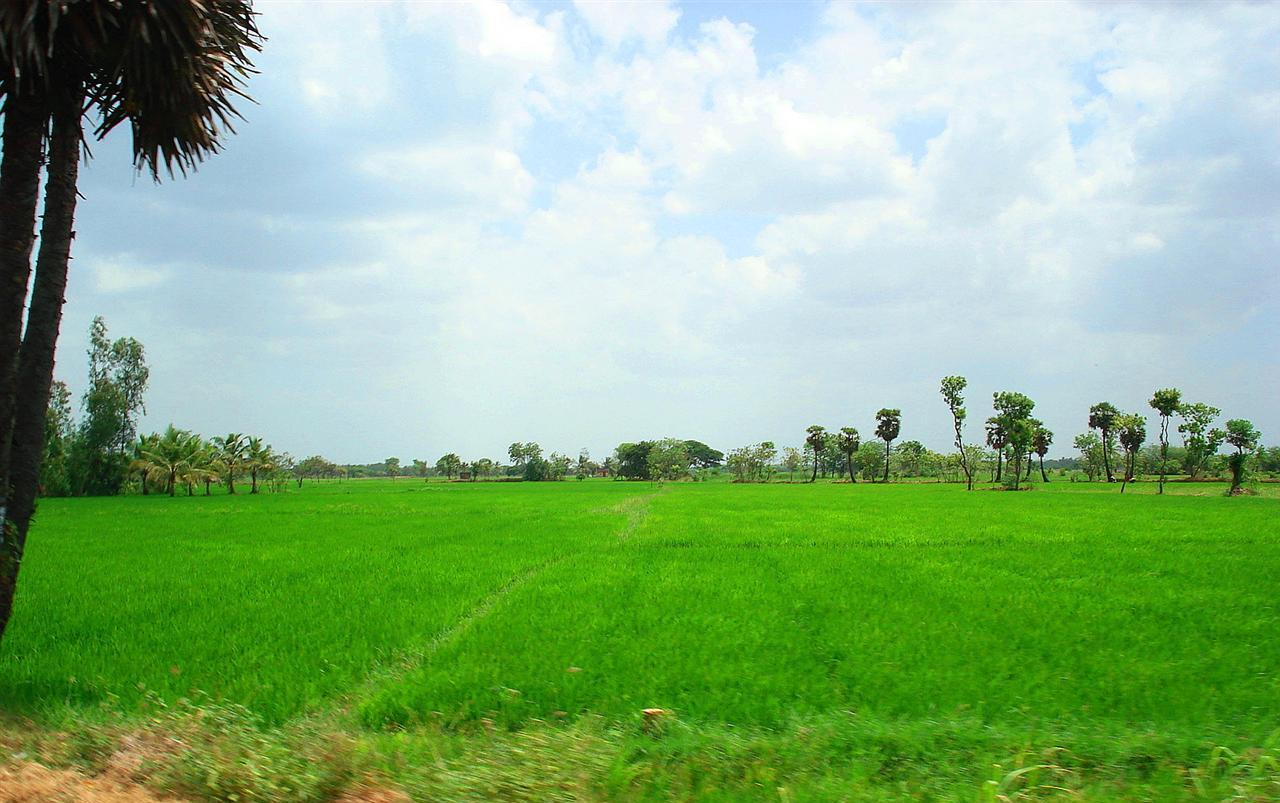
Paddy field in Peravurani Taluk

Agriculture is the main economy of this region. rice is extensively grown here and is the staple of this people. paddy, groundnuts, bananas and sugarcane are the major crops in the region. This area is the highest producer of coconut in the state. Coir industry is also an important livelihood of people here due to the large generation of coconut value added products. From here banana, gingelly, sugarcane, groundnuts and coconuts are exported domestically and internationally. Dairy products are also a major source of income in this region. The nearby village Mavadukurichi is known for its rich dairy products.everyday this village yields a large volume buffalo milk that is being distributed to other villages. People in this area are very much addicted to sea food that is brought from nearby coastal towns such as Mallipattinam, Adirampattinam, Sethubavachatram and Muthupet by road to the Peravurani town fish market. At the time of the summer when all the lakes dry-up with fresh water fish for commercial business. Since agriculture is extensively practiced only agrarian based industries are common in this region.

Industries like Shrimp farming are also booming on the coastal sides of Sethubavachatram. Which accelerates the sea based industries like Fishing Net production. There are a lot of Fishing Net production units working for the purpose of fishery businesses. However Peravurani has no major industries in operation. OPAL Energy Solution (P) Ltd and R.G.Fibers are the only two notable factories in operation in this area.

== Administration ==
Town Panchayat Official
Executive Officer	M.Manimozhiyan
Elected Representatives
Town President	N. Ashok Kumar
Vice President	Parimala Neelakandan
Member of Legislative Assembly	N.Ashok Kumar
Member of Parliament	S. S. Palanimanickam

Peravurani is the Selection Grade Town Panchayat Town. It was constituted as Town Panchayat on 04, June 1951 by the Tamil Nadu Government order No. 1118/LA. Peravurani also declared as headquarters of the Peravurani Taluk and Peravurani (State Assembly Constituency). The Peravurani Town Panchayat has 18 wards and there is an elected councillor for each of those wards. The functions of the Town Panchayat are devolved into six departments. Namely General Administration/Personnel, Engineering, Revenue/Taxing, Public Health, City Planning and Information Technology (IT). All these departments are under the control of a Town Panchayat Executive Officer who is the executive head of the Town. The legislative powers are vested in a body of 18 members, one each from the 18 wards. The legislative body is headed by an elected Town President assisted by a Deputy Town President.

== Politics ==
Leaders from Peravurani have been dominated in both Tamil Nadu and Indian politics. Especially different individuals from different political parties were worked in many prestigious designations.

=== Peravurani Assembly Constituency ===
Peravurani assembly seat was created from Pattukkottai Assembly constituency on 1967. Peravurani is the headquarters of Peravurani (State Assembly Constituency). It elects a member to the Tamil Nadu Legislative Assembly once every five years from 1967. Peravurani selected 12 members to Tamil Nadu State Assembly till the date.

=== Election results ===
The Member of legislative assembly of Peravurani (State Assembly Constituency) after the 2021 Tamil Nadu Legislative Assembly election is N. Ashokkumar from Dravida Munnetra Kazhagam party.

== Notable people ==
=== Political leaders ===
- M. R. Govindan is an Indian politician and former minister and member of the Legislative Assembly of Tamil Nadu. Who born and brought up in Mudachikadu Village of Peravurani Taluk. He was elected to the Tamil Nadu legislative assembly as an Anna Dravida Munnetra Kazhagam candidate from Peravurani (state assembly constituency) in 1977, 1980, and 1984
- S. V. Thirugnana Sambandam is an Indian politician and former member of the Legislative Assembly of Tamil Nadu. He was elected to the Tamil Nadu legislative assembly as a Tamil Maanila Congress (Moopanar) candidate from Peravurani (state assembly constituency) in the year of 1996 and 2001 assembly elections

=== Cinema personalities ===
- Agathiyan is an Indian film director. He has won the National Film Award for Best Direction, National Film Award for Best Screenplay, Filmfare Award for Best Tamil Director, Tamil Nadu State Film Award for Best Film in 1996 for the Tamil film Kadhal Kottai starred actor Ajithkumar.
- Dhivyadharshini is a popular host and actress whose father hails from Thennangudi a nearby village of Peravurani.
- Karunas is a popular actor in the Tamil Film Industry who was born in Kuruvikkarambai village of Peravurani.

=== Media personalities ===
- Dhivyadharshini is an Indian television host and actress born in Thennangudi village, Peravurani and brought up in Chennai, Tamil Nadu. She featured in supporting roles in films including Kamal Hassan's production Nala Damayanthi (2003).
- V. Thiruselvam is an Indian Tamil television director and actor who was born in Nadiam village, Peravurani. He is known for directing hit serials like Kolangal and Ethir Neechal and acting in Metti Oli

== Education ==
Peravurani Literacy Rate on 2011
Gender	Percent(%)
Male	79%
Female	63%

Peravurani has an average literacy rate of 70%, higher than the national average of 59.5%. male literacy is 79%, and female literacy is 63%. In Peravurani, 11% of the population is under 6 years of age as per National Population Census of 2011. As of 2019, there were different private and government running schools and colleges in Peravurani Town. There is around more than 15 government and private running schools and 3 colleges within the town limits. There were well-established institutions such as follows.

=== Government educational institutions ===
- Government Boys Higher Secondary School, Peravurani
- Government Girls Higher Secondary School, Peravurani
- Government Arts and Science College established in the year of 2013 and inaugurated by former Tamil Nadu Chief Minister J.Jayalalithaa on 14 September 2013. Which is affiliated to Bharathidasan University, Trichirappalli
- SMR East Coast College of Engineering and Technology. Which situated in the coastal area of Kattumavadi. The engineering institution which, affiliated to Anna University, Chennai
- Anna University - Pattukkottai Campus, Rajamadam
- Government High school

=== Private educational institutions ===
- Sri Venkateshwara Arts and Science College for Women, Peravurani
- Sri Venkateshwara College of Education, Peravurani
- Dr. Kalam Polytechnic, Avanam
- Dr. Kalam College of Pharmacy, Avanam
- Dr. J.C.Kumarappa Higher Secondary School, Peravurani
- Muvendar Matriculation Higher Secondary School, Sengamangalam
- V.R.Veerappa Memorial Higher Secondary School, Koopulikadu
- Atlantic International School, Veeriyankottai
- Sri Venkateshwara CBSE, Peravurani
- August Zion Nursery and Primary School, Peravurani
- St. Anne's Convent & High School, Athanoor
- JCK CBSE Vidyalaya, Peravurani

== Transport ==
Peravurani town has been well connected with different parts of Tamil Nadu and other nearby cities. This town connected with different state highways and rail lines. The nearest bus services were available at Peravurani town while the nearest airport is situated 90 kilometers (56 mi) away at Tiruchirapalli.

=== Rail Lines ===
The railway station is located just within the town. It was connected to Thiruthuraipoondi Junction towards north and Karaikkudi Junction towards south. The station was initially built with meter gauge infrastructure and now it converted to broad gauge in the amount of ₹711 crore (US$100 million) sanctioned in 2007–2008. Peravurani train station have three passenger services daily with one express and two passenger trains.

Train Schedule - Peravurani Railway Station
Train No	Train Route	Arrival	Departure	Interval
06847	Thiruvarur - Karaikudi via Peravurani	12:16	12:18	2 Minutes
06848	Karaikudi - Thiruvarur via Peravurani	04:30	04:32	2 Minutes
06855	Pattukkottai - Karaikudi via Peravurani	02:28	02:30	2 Minutes
06856	Karaikudi - Pattukkottai via Peravurani	11:43	11:45	2 Minutes

=== Road lines ===
Tamil Nadu State Highway 71 (SH-71) is a State Highway maintained by the Highways Department of Government of Tamil Nadu. It connects Musiri with Sethubhavachathiram via Peravurani. The total length of the SH-71 is 150.69 kilometers (93.63 miles).

Distance from Near by Towns / via Road
Town	Distance (in km)
Pattukkottai	22
Keeramangalam	13
Aranthangi	26
Mallipattinam	16
Kattumavadi	26
Thiruchitrambalam	11

Distance from Major Cities of Tamil Nadu / via Road
City	Distance (in km)
Chennai	435
Madurai	156
Tiruchirappalli	104
Coimbatore	321
Tuticorin	264
Thirunelveli	300

== Climate ==
Peravurani having tropical climate environment, So here when it compared with winter, the summers have much more rainfall. The maximum temperature in peravurani is 36 °C and the minimum recorded temperature is 36 °C . The maximum rainfall recorded is averages to 1217 mm. In Peravurani, precipitation is the lowest in February, with an average of 18 mm. In October and November, the precipitation reaches its peak, with an average of 187 mm. In Peravurani, average temperature is 31.3 °C, may is the hottest month at 25.7 °C on average, January is the coldest month.

Climate data for Peravurani Town (altitude: 16m)
Month	Jan	Feb	Mar	Apr	May	Jun	Jul	Aug	Sep	Oct	Nov	Dec	Year
Mean daily maximum °C (°F)	29.3 (84.7)	31 (88)	33.5 (92.3)	35 (95)	35.7 (96.3)	35.2 (95.4)	34.4 (93.9)	34 (93)	35.5 (95.9)	32 (90)	29.7 (85.5)	28.9 (84.0)	32.9 (91.2)
Daily mean °C (°F)	25.7 (78.3)	26.7 (80.1)	28.8 (83.8)	30.7 (87.3)	30.3 (86.5)	31 (88)	30.4 (86.7)	29.9 (85.8)	29.5 (85.1)	28.4 (83.1)	26.7 (80.1)	25.7 (78.3)	28.6 (83.6)
Mean daily minimum °C (°F)	22.1 (71.8)	22.7 (72.9)	24.2 (75.6)	26.5 (79.7)	27.2 (81.0)	26.9 (80.4)	26.5 (79.7)	25.9 (78.6)	25.7 (78.3)	24.8 (76.6)	23.7 (74.7)	22.6 (72.7)	24.9 (76.8)
Average precipitation mm (inches)	37 (1.5)	18 (0.7)	20 (0.8)	49 (1.9)	38 (1.5)	38 (1.5)	64 (2.5)	99 (3.9)	90 (3.5)	187 (7.4)	181 (7.1)	134 (5.3)	955 (37.6)
Source: Climate-Data.org (altitude: 16m)

== Tourism ==
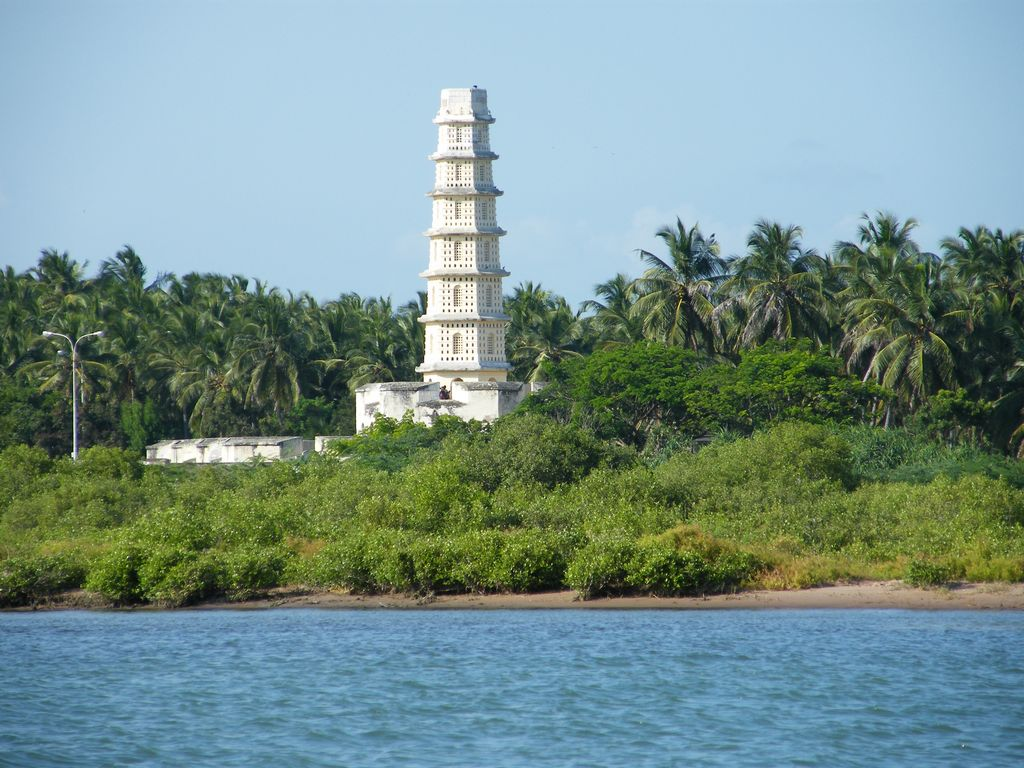
Manora, The Ancient Fort of Tamil Nadu, India

- Manora, an eight storied victory tower built by the Maratha King Serfoji in 1814 to commemorate the victory of the British over Napoleon Bonaparte at Waterloo, is a well known tourist destination. The name Manora is derived from the minaret meaning small minar. From the top of this tower, one has a panoramic view of the palm-fringed Bay of Bengal. The tower has also served as a lighthouse. Manora is located about 15 km east of Peravurani at Mallipattinam village.

== See also ==
- Peravurani Taluk
- Peravurani (state assembly constituency)
