= Karambayam =

- Village
- Country: India
- State: Tamil Nadu
- District: Thanjavur
- Taluk: Pattukottai

Population
  - Total: 6,500

Languages
  - Official: Tamil
- Time zone: UTC+5:30 (IST)

Karambayam is a village in Pattukkottai in the Indian state of Tamil Nadu. The village has Muthu Mariyamman Temple, an Amman temple.

== Statistics ==
Population of the village	4000
Best transportation mode	Bus
Proximity to district	35 km
Proximity to talluk	10 km
Names of tributaries in the village	No
Main occupation men in the village	Agriculture
Main occupation women in the village	Agriculture, House wife
Cost of 1-acre (4,000 m^{2}) of land in the village	2.5 Lakh
Type of crop	Paddy, Groundnut, Coconut
Non-farm Source Income	Migration to foreign countries, Daily wages
Nearest School and distance	Govt Higher Sec School
Number of students in the school	700
Staff strength	30
No. of certified doctors	1
Nearest PHC to village	Karambayam
Nearest College	Meenakshi Chandrasekaran Arts and Science College for Women
No. of pharmacy stores	Yes
Beds in Hospital	3
Banks nearby: Names and distance	PACB In Karambayam
What Banking Products are you aware of	Agri loan, Jewel loan etc.,
What is the rate of interest charged by moneylenders	3 to 4%
Number of self-help groups in village	25+
Cost of 200 square feet (19 m^{2}) shop in the village(Rs)	10000/-
Rent of 200 square feet (19 m^{2}) shop in the village(Rs)	700/- Main attractions the Mariamman Kovil festival( April month every year) and the football tournament.
