= Thittakkudi =

Thittakudi
- village
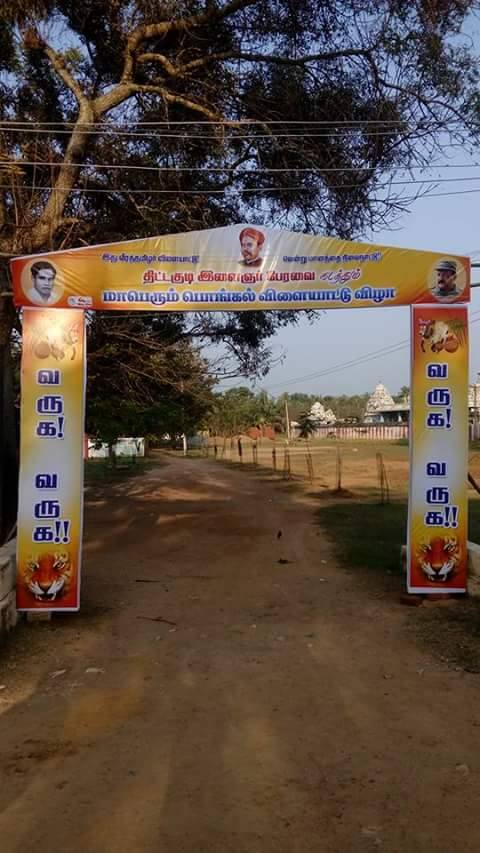

- Location in Tamil Nadu, India Thittakudi (India)
- Coordinates: 10°28′30″N 79°20′0″E
- Country: India
- State: Tamil Nadu
- District: Thanjavur
- Taluk: Pattukkottai
- Time zone: UTC+5:30 (IST)
- Vehicle registration: TN-

Thittakkudi is a village located near Pattukkottai town in Thanjavur district in the state of Tamil Nadu, India. The village is located at about 6 km north of Pattukkottai on Pattukkottai - Kumbakonam highway & 350 km South from the state capital, Chennai.
