= Thamarankottai =

- Village
- Location in Tamil Nadu, India Thamarankottai (India)
- Coordinates: 10.43°N 79.32°E
- Country: India
- State: Tamil Nadu
- District: Thanjavur
- Taluk: Pattukkottai

Government
  - Village Panchayat President: Kanagasabai [North] Vadivelu [South]

Area
  - Total: 21.7 km^{2} (8.4 sq mi)
  - Rank: 1
- Elevation: 23 m (75 ft)

Population (2001)
  - Total: 10,530
  - Rank: 1
  - Density: 485/km^{2} (1,260/sq mi)

Languages
  - Official: Tamil
- Time zone: UTC+5:30 (IST)
- PIN: 614613
- Telephone code: 91 4373
- Vehicle registration: TN 49
- Sex ratio: 1000 M for 1094 F ♂/♀

Thamarankottai is a village in Pattukkottai Taluk in the Thanjavur district, located in the delta of the Kaveri river. It is one of the 36 villages falls under the Musugundan Nadu in the district.

Thamarankottai is the largest village in the Thanjavur district in terms of Area.

The village is divided into Thamarankottai North and Thamarankottai South.

Melakkadu, Kezhakkadu and Rasiangadu are the hamlets of Thamarankottai North, while Sengapaduthankkadu, Manjavayal, Karisakkadu and Karungkulam are the hamlets of Thamarankottai South.

Mangrove forest is located in the village, its official name is Thamarankottai Reserve forest. It comes under the Muthupet Lagoon Forest.

== Demography ==
According to the latest national census, Thamarankottai North has a population of 6,031, of which 2,872 are males and 3,159 are females. in 1,460 households across the three hamlets of Keezakadu, Melakkadu, and Rasiangadu. Thamarankottai South has 4,499 people (2,156 males and 2,343 females) in 1,110 households across the four hamlets of Manjavayal, Sengapaduthankadu, Karungulam, Karisakadu, and Mankanangadu.
