= Palanjur =

Coordinates: 12°34′N 79°33′E

- village
- Interactive map of Palanjur
- Country: India
- State: Tamil Nadu
- District: Thanjavur
- Taluk: Pattukkottai

Population (2001)
  - Total: 2,018

Languages
  - Official: Tamil
- Time zone: UTC+5:30 (IST)

Palanjur is a village in the Pattukkottai taluk of Thanjavur district, Tamil Nadu, India.

== Demographics ==
As per the 2001 census, Palanjur had a total population of 2018 with 954 males and 1064 females. The sex ratio was 1115. The literacy rate was 72.74.

== Administration ==
Palanjur comes under the Pattukkottai assembly constituency which elects a member to the Tamil Nadu Legislative Assembly once every five years and it is a part of the Thanjavur (Lok Sabha constituency) which elects its Member of Parliament (MP) once in five years.
