= Peravurani Taluk =

Peravurani taluk is a taluk in the Thanjavur district of Tamil Nadu, India. The headquarters is the town of Peravurani.

== Demographics ==
According to the 2011 census, the taluk of Peravurani had a population of 123,792 with 60,295 males and 63,497 females. There were 1053 women for every 1000 men. The taluk had a literacy rate of 71.21. Child population in the age group below 6 was 5,847 Males and 5,709 Females.

== Villages ==
The following is an incomplete list of villages in the Peravurani taluk:

- Sengamangalam
- Avanam
- Sethbavachathiriram
- Thuraiyur
- Pinnavasal
- Nattanikkottai
- Serubalakkadu
- Ammaiyandi
- Udayanadu
- Thennangudi
- Thirupooranikkadu
- Nadakadu
- Nadankadu
- Kalathur
- Korattur
- Mudachikkadu
- Mudukadu
- Munumakadu
- Nadiyam
- Senthalai vayal
- Vembangudi-Paingal
- Kalanikkottai
- Veerayankottai
- Kuruvikkarambai
- Solaganarvayal
- Kalanivasal
- KR puram
- kalaingar Nagar, Samathuvapuram
- Vathalaikkadu
- Kaivinivayal
- Valapiramankadu
- Kalagam
- Pookkollai
- Perumagalur
- Irattai Vayal
- Vilangulam
- Solaikaadu
- Kolakkudi
- Kalluranikadu
