= Pattukkottai Taluk =

Administrative unit in Tamil Nadu, India

Coordinates: 10.43°N 79.32°E

Pattukkottai taluk is a taluk of Thanjavur district of the Indian state of Tamil Nadu. The headquarters of the taluk is the town of Pattukkottai. It is the biggest taluk in the district.

== Demographics ==
According to the 2011 census, the taluk of Pattukkottai had a population of 396,476 with 191,592 males and 204,884 females. There were 1,069 women for every 1,000 men. The taluk had a literacy rate of 73.3%. Child population in the age group below 6 was 19,083 Males and 18,438 Females.

== Villages ==
- Aaladikumulai
- Aalampallam
- Alathur
- Aathikkottai
- Adirampattinam
- Aladikkadu
- Anaikkadu
- Athiveddi
- Balareguramasamudram
- Chatramthokkalikadu
- Chokkanathapuram
- Chokkanavur
- Eduthanivayal
- Enathi
- Ennaivayal
- Eralivayal
- Ettivayal
- Ettupulikkadu
- Gopalasamudram
- K.Unjiyaviduthi
- Kalichankkottai
- Kallivayal
- Karisavayal
- Kasankkadu
- Kattaiyankadu
- Kayavoor
- Kollukkadu
- Kotthadivayal
- Kullukkadu
- Madampattavur
- Madathikkadu
- Madubashanipuram
- Manavayal
- Mannankadu
- Maravakkadu
- Maravanvayal
- Marudangavayal
- Mohur
- Moothakkuruchi
- Naduvikurichi
- Nainankulam
- Narasingapuram
- Nattuchalai
- Neivaviduthi
- Palanjur
- Palathali
- Palayee Agraharam
- Pallathur
- Palliodiaivayal
- Parakkalakkottai
- Pillankuli
- Ponkundu
- Ponnaivaraiyankkottai
- Poovalur
- Pudhukkottai Ullur
- Pudupattinam
- Pukkarambai
- Pulavanchi
- Puliyakudi
- Regunathapuram
- Reguramasamudram
- Rendampulikadu
- Silambavelankkadu
- Soorankkadu
- Sukkiranpatti
- Surappallam
- Thamarankkottai
- Thittakkudi
- Thittakudi
- Thuvarankuruchi
- Thuravikkadu
- Udayamudaiyan
- Vaattakkudi
- Vadiakkadu
- Vellivayal
- Vendakkottai
