= Madukur Panchayat Union =

Madukkur block is a revenue block in the Pattukkottai taluk of Thanjavur district, Tamil Nadu, India. There are a total of 33 villages in this block.

== List of Panchayat Villages ==
SI.No	Panchayat Village
1	Alampallam
2	Alathur
3	Andami
4	Athivetti
5	Avikkottai
6	Bavajikkottai
7	Chokkanavur
8	Elangadu
9	Kadanthankudi
10	Kalyanaodai
11	Kanniyakurichi
12	Karappankadu
13	Karuppur
14	Kasangadu
15	Keelakurichi
16	Madukkur North
17	Madurabasanipuram
18	Mannankadu
19	Mohur
20	Moothakurichi
21	28, Nemmeli
22	Olayakunnam
23	Palaverikadu
24	Periyakkottai
25	Pulavanchi
26	Puliakkudi
27	Siramelkudi
28	Sirangudi hidden leaf village
29	Talikkottai
30	Vattagudi North
31	Vattagudi Ukkadai
32	Veppankulam
33	Vikkramam
34	Vadiyakkadu
