= Madukkur =

- Town panchayat
- Location in Tamil Nadu, India Madukkur (India)
- Coordinates: 10.48°N 79.4°E
- Country: India
- State: Tamil Nadu
- District: Thanjavur

Area
  - Total: 5 km^{2} (1.9 sq mi)
- Elevation: 8 m (26 ft)

Population (Government website)
  - Total: 16,273
  - Density: 3,300/km^{2} (8,400/sq mi)

Languages
  - Official: Tamil
- Time zone: UTC+5:30 (IST)
- PIN: 614903
- Telephone code: +91 4373
- RTO regd.: TN49
- Website: townpanchayat.in/madukkur

Madukkur is a town in Thanjavur District, Tamil Nadu, India, that falls into Class IV of a "town panchayat". In a 2001 census, its total population amounted to 16,273. The town has 5 primary schools, 3 middle schools, and 2 higher secondary schools. The town has a weekly market which is opened every Tuesday, and on festivals, it serves as a retailing place for its nearby villages. The town's primary occupation is agriculture, with its water irrigating from Kalyanavodai River.

== Geography ==
Madukkur is located 12 km West of Pattukkottai, 18 km East of Muthupet, 15 km South of Adirampattinam, and 22 km North of Mannargudi.

== Education ==
- Ramambalpuram PUMS
- Government Boys Higher Secondary School
- Government Girls Higher Secondary School
- Fathima Mariam Higher Secondary School
- Ar-Rahman Nursery and Primary School
- Sandhapettai Government School
- E.H. Hema Nursery and Primary School
- Little Flower Nursery and Primary School
- Church Park Nursery & Primary School
- Theresa Nursery & Primary School
- PK Street PUMS School
- Chetty Theru Government School
- Oorachi Ondriya Thodaka Palli (Sun Gardan)
- Oorachi Ondriya Thodaka Palli (Edaiyakkadu)
- Ooratchi Ondriya Thodakka Palli (padappaikkadu)
- LVR Nursery & Primary School
- Silver Birds Nursery & Primary School
- Western Matriculation High School
- Annai Sumayya Arabic Madrasa For Girls

== Banks ==
- Indian Bank
- State Bank of India
- City Union Bank
- Lakshmi Vilas Bank
- Kumbakonam Mutual Benefit Fund Ltd
- Karur Vysya Bank
- cooperative bank
- HDFC BANK

== Madukkur Block ==
There are 33 villages in the Madukkur Block. Among them are:

- Ramambalpuram
- Alathur
- Athivetti
- Elangadu
- Siramelkudi
- Kadathankudi
- Karappankadu
- Kalayanaodai
- Periyakkottai
- Kanniyakurichi
- Karuppur
- Kasangadu
- Keelakurichi
- Mohur
- Mannankadu
- Nemmeli
- Veppankulam
- Vikramam
- Vattakudi
- Pulavanchi
- Andami
- Moothakurichihi
- chokkanavur
- Kottaikkadu
- Mannankadu
- Alanpallam

== Bus Routes ==
- Pattukkottai to Kumbakonam
- Pattukkottai to Mannargudi
- Mannargudi to Adirampattinam
- Papanadu to Perugavalnthan
- Pattukottai to Kalyanaodai
- Madukkur to Thanjavur
- Madukkur to Muthupet
- Madukkur to Chennai
- Madukkur to Nagore
- Madukkur to Vetharanyam
