= Vattakudi Ukkadai =

Vattakudi South Vattakudi Ukkadai
- village
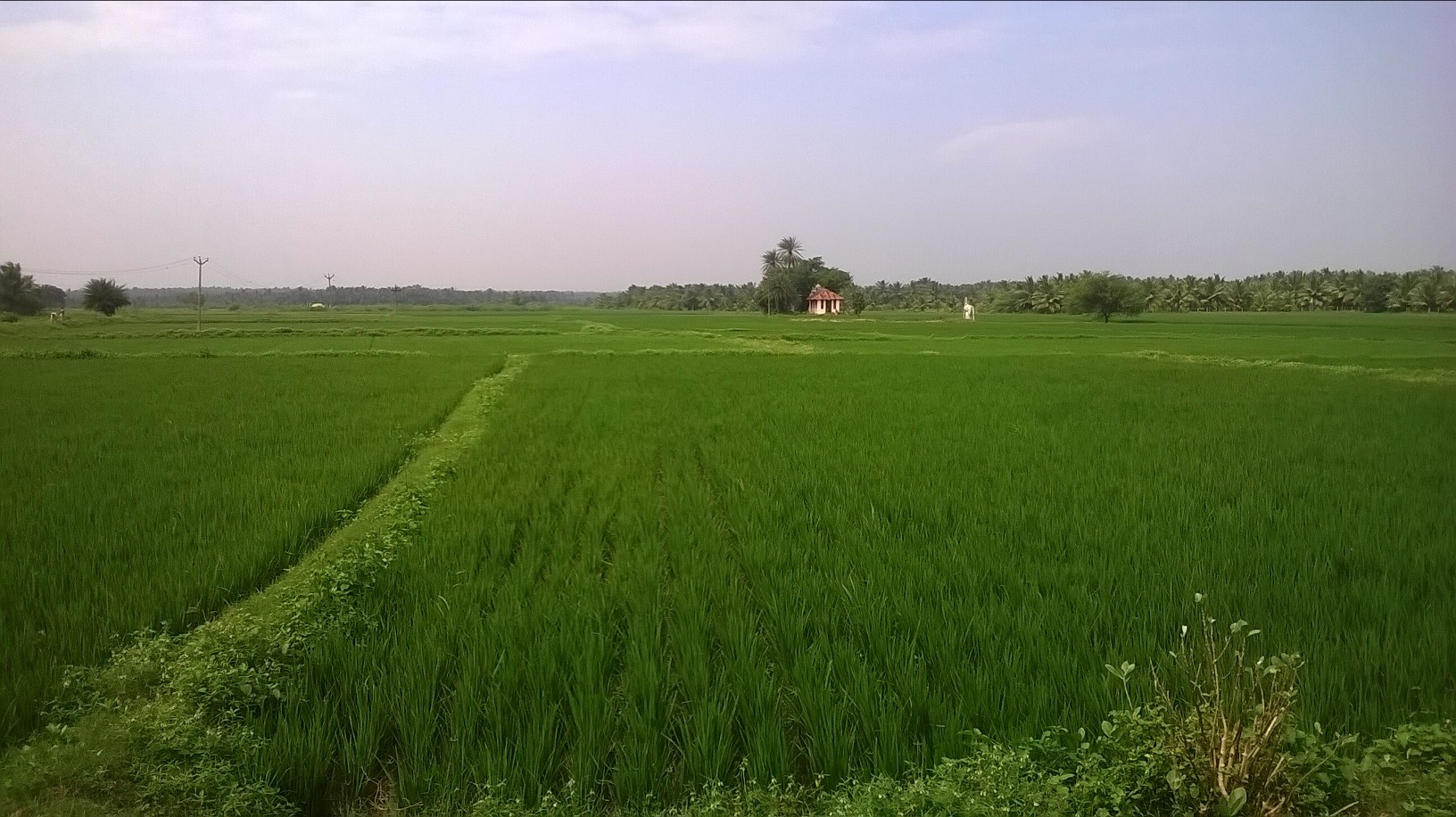
- Paddy fields of Vattakudi Ukkadai

- Location within Tamil Nadu Location within India
- Coordinates: 10.439°N 79.406°E
- Country: India
- State: Tamil Nadu
- District: Thanjavur
- Block: Madukur

Government
  - MP: K. Parasuraman (AIADMK)
  - MLA: N. R. Rengarajan
- Elevation: 13 m (43 ft)

Population (2011)
  - Total: 1,353
- Time zone: UTC+5:30 (IST)
- Postal Index Number: 614613

Vattakudi Ukkadai, also known as Vattakudi South, is a village in Tamil Nadu, India. It is located in the Madukur block of Thanjavur district.

== Demographics ==
According to the 2011 census of India, the Vattakudi South village has a population of 1353. This includes 680 males and 673 females. The effective (6 years and above) literacy rate of village is 75.63%.

== Geography ==
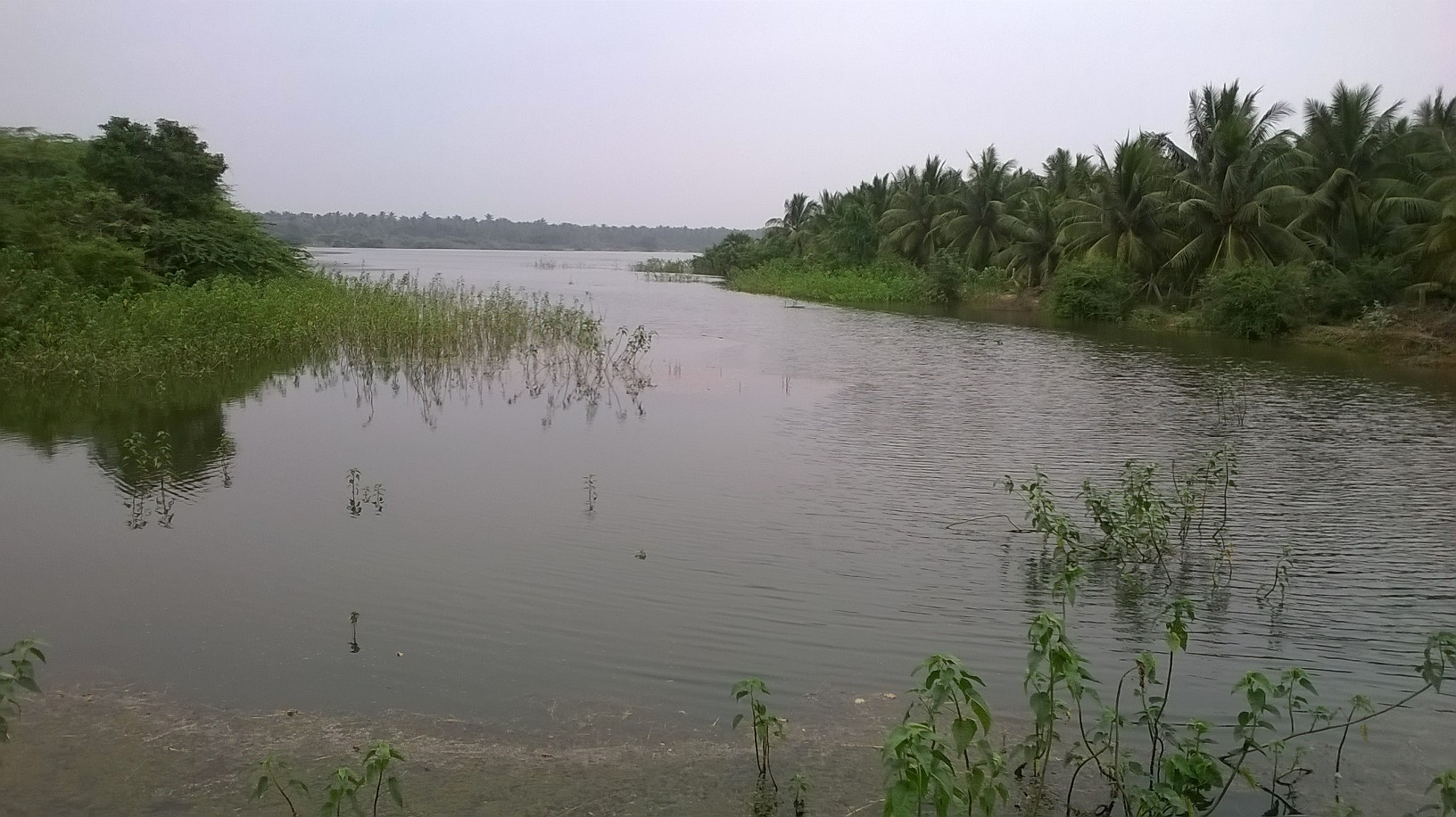
A lake in the village

Vattakudi South is 12 km from the city of Pattukkottai. The coast of the Bay of Bengal is just 12km away, with Manora fort 15km away from this village. Due to its geographical position, Vattakudi South experiences hot and humid climate and there is no extreme variation in seasonal temperature. As it is nearer to the equator, the summer season starts from April and extends till early June. This period observes the hottest part of the year, locally known as "Agni Nakshatram" or "Khatri".

Nearby villages include Vattakudi North, Kasankadu, Athivetti, and Pichinikkadu.

== Economy ==
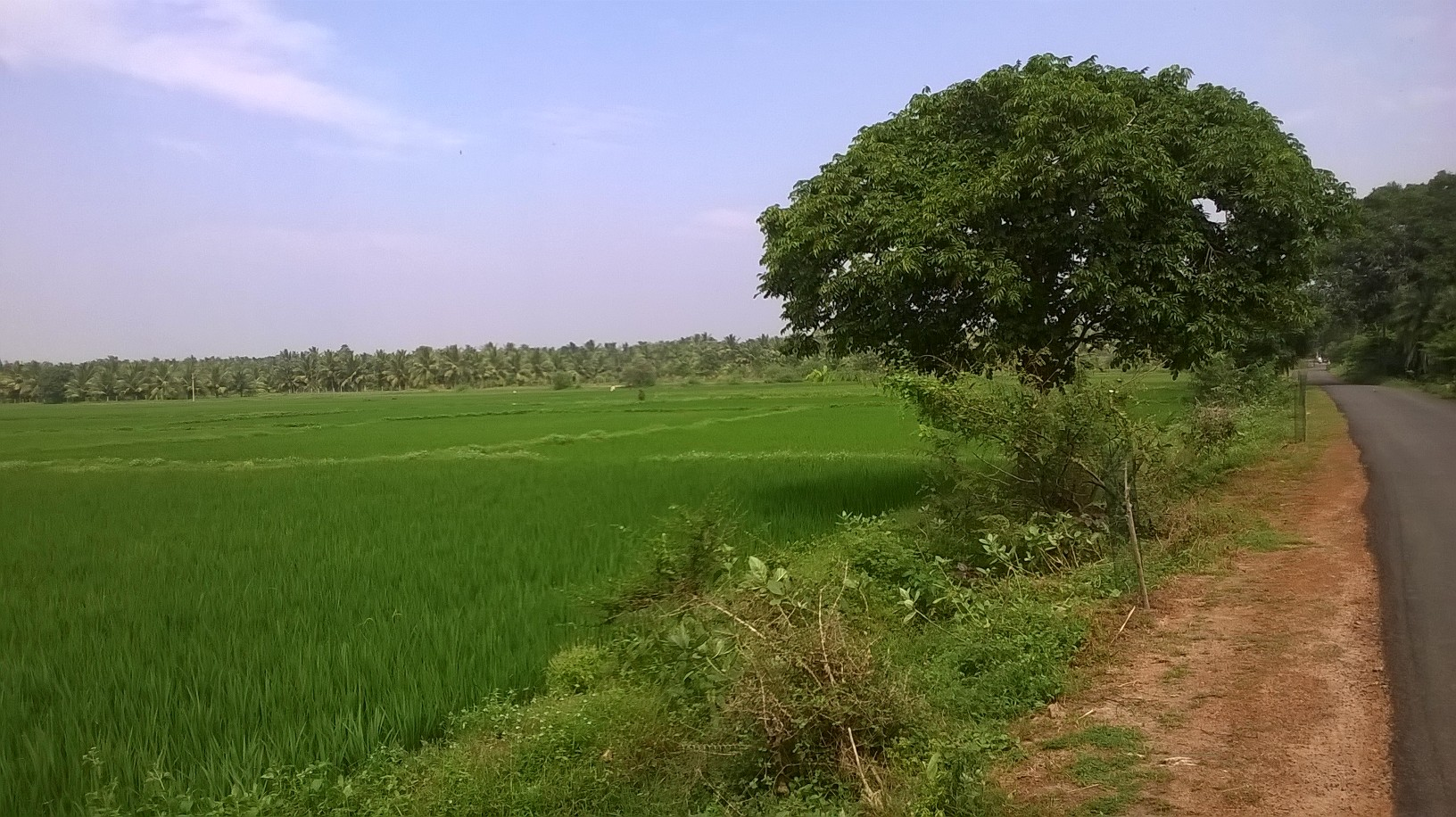
A field in the village

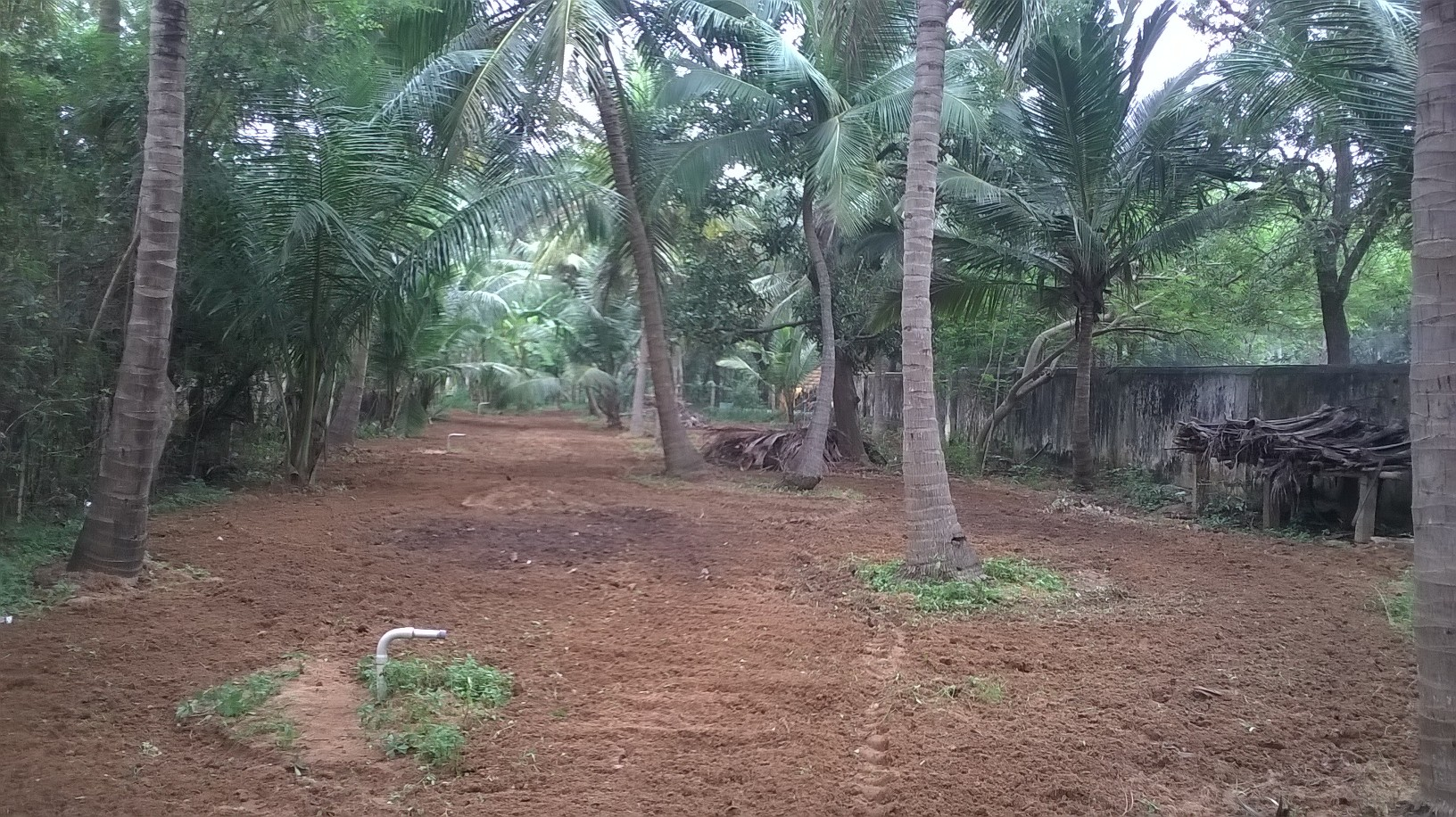
Coconut Farm

Most of the residents are involved in agriculture and dependent activities. The agriculture in the village relies on water from the Kaveri River for irrigation. Paddy and coconut are the major crops in the village.

== Administration ==
The village is administered by a gram panchayat. It comes under the Pattukkottai assembly constituency and the Thanjavur parliamentary constituency. The current MLA is N. R. Rengarajan of TMC (M), and the current MP is K. Parasuraman of AIADMK. The current panchayat President is K. Amarajothi Kanadasamy.

== Culture ==
The temples in the village include Sri Magha Muthumariamman temple, Shri Minnadiyar temple, Shri Vinayagar temple, and Shri Ayyanar temple. Sri Balathandayudhabani temple is located near Vattakudi South.

The famous festivals are:

- Pongal festival (4 days) celebrated in January
  - The fourth day of the Pongal festival Sports events for Adults & children in Vattakudi South organized by village adults.
- Tamil Varuda Pirapu celebrated in April
- Sri Magha Muthumariamman temple Thiruvizha (8 days) celebrated in June (Vaikasi Visakam)
  - The 7th day of Thiruvizha (Visagam) event is Kavadi
  - The 8th day of the festival event is Swami Therottam.
- Vinayagar Chathurthi celebrated in September
- Ayutha Poojai celebrated in October
- Deepavali & Thiru Karthigai celebrated in November
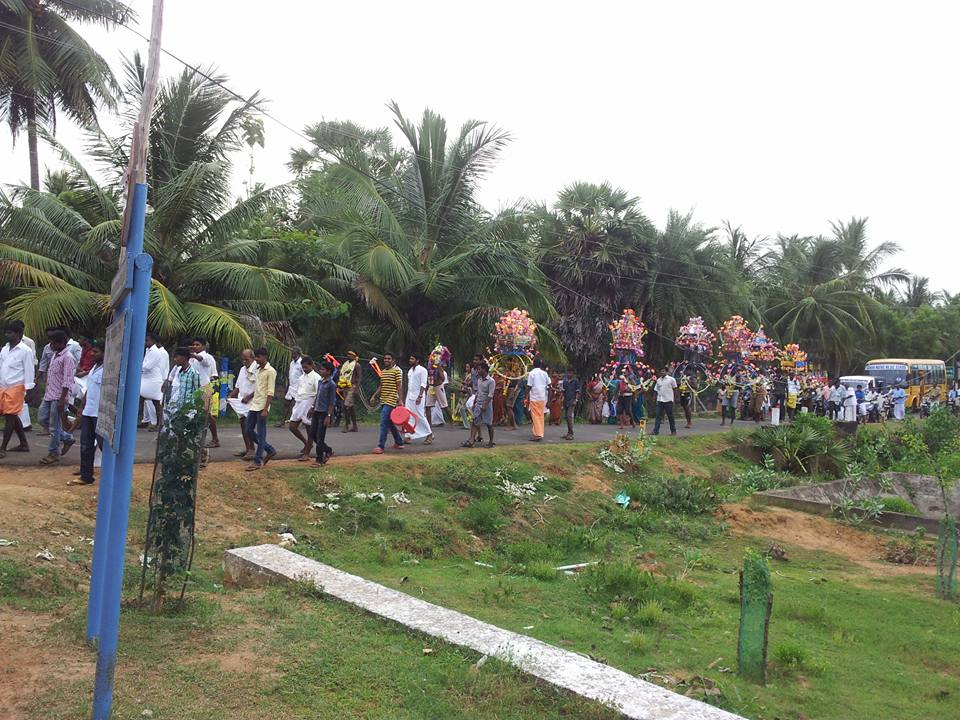
Kavadi

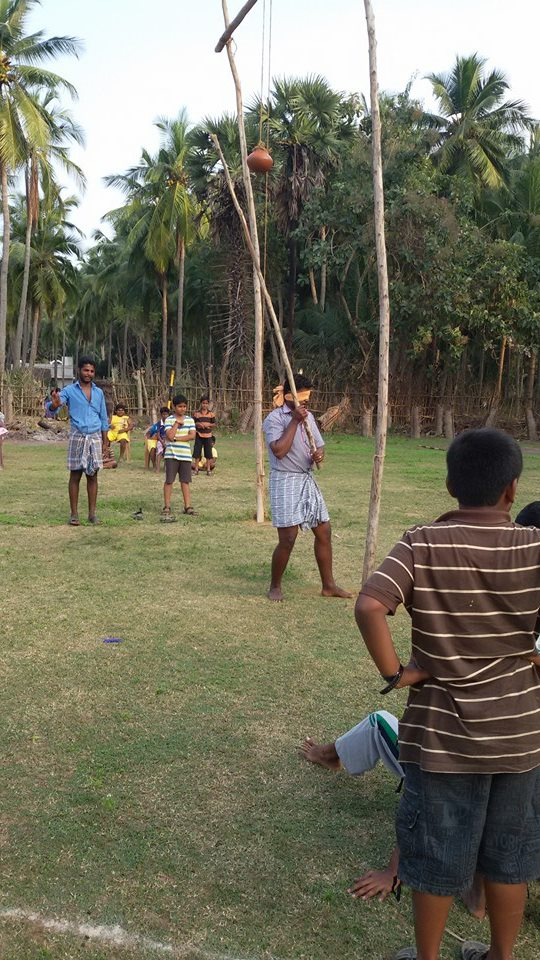
Sports events for adults

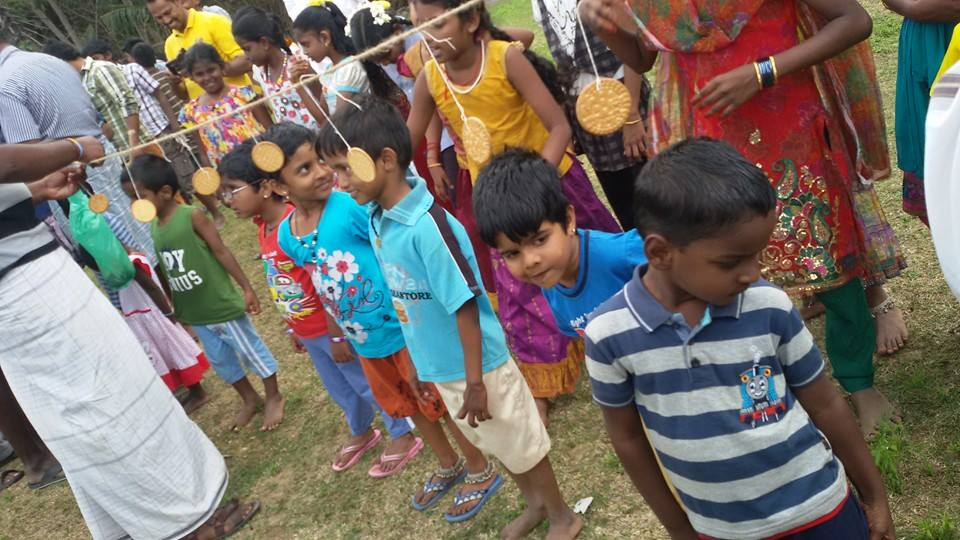
Sports events for children
