= Mannankadu =

- village
- Nickname: Mannai
- Location in Tamil Nadu, India Mannankadu (India)
- Coordinates: 10°25′10″N 79°23′15″E
- Country: India
- State: Tamil Nadu
- District: Thanjavur
- Taluk: Pattukkottai

Area
  - Total: 10.02 km^{2} (3.87 sq mi)
- Elevation: 25 m (82 ft)

Population (2001)
  - Total: 2,619
  - Density: 261.4/km^{2} (677.0/sq mi)

Languages
  - Official: Tamil
- Time zone: UTC+5:30 (IST)
- PIN: 614 613
- Website: www.mannankadu.org

Mannankadu (also, Mannangadu) is a village in the Pattukkottai taluk of Thanjavur district, Tamil Nadu, India. It is one of the 32 villages falls under the Musugundan Nadu in the district. Mannangadu is one of the revenue village in its taluk. It is located on state highway Adirampattinam-Mannargudi-Kumbakonam, between Adirampattinam and Madukkur. It is the fourth largest village in Pattukkottai taluk, after Thamarankottai, Thambikottai and Aalathur. Total geographical area of the Village is 1002.02 hectares. The main income source of this village is Agriculture.

== Demographics ==
Mannankadu is a rural village located straight east of Pattukkottai town at about 7 km. Pattukkottai is a primary commercial location for the region. Located in the Thanjavur district of Tamil Nadu, India, Pattukkottai Taluk is one of the eight revenue divisions of the district. State highway 66 transects the village north–south having Madukkur in its north and the coastal town of Adirampattinam in the south.

As per the 2001 census, Mannankadu had a total population of 2619 with 1253 males and 1366 females. The sex ratio was 1090. The literacy rate was 63.54.

== Geography ==
Located approximately 25 meters above sea level, geographically this village is at 10º25’ North & 79º23’ East, latitude and longitude. This village has direct road access to Kasangadu in the north and Thuvarankurichi in the south. New route between Mannangadu and Thamarankottai is under construction. Mannankadu is spread over 1000.02 hectares. This sprawling village had a population of 2619 in 2001 and had the literacy was 64%. According to Census India, but currently the count may be well over 3000.

It is bordered by Kasangadu and Regunathapuram to the north, Vattakudi to the northeast, Athivetti to east, Thamarankottai to the southeast, Thuvarankurichi to the south and south west, Vendakottai to west and Nattuchalai to northwest. The nearest towns are Pattukkottai, Adirampattinam and Madukkur. It is located at a distance of 352 km South of State capital Chennai and 54 km South East of District capital Thanjavur.

Mannankadu is a village panchayat incorporates several hamlets. They are:
1. Ichadikkollai, in the north
2. Melakkadu, in the west
3. Keezhakkadu, in the east
4. Therkkuveli or Thekkiveli, in the middle
5. Therkku Mannankadu, in the south
6. Pudhukkudi, in the southwest
7. Moonumaakkollai, in the southeast

== Agriculture ==
Mannankadu is a farming village. Coconut, mango, tamarind, citrus, rice, peanut, black-gram, ground nut and corn are the common crops in the village. For farm irrigation, water sources are wells, reservoirs and canals. Two rivers are flowing through this village, so the village has better water facility.

The most predominant livelihood of the people is Agriculture and Animal Husbandry. The River Cauvery, from Mettur Dam is the back bone of Agricultural activities. As in tail end of the river, this village has to face hardship whenever there is a failure in monsoon. Apart from this, foreign currency flow from the emigrants and expatriates in overseas like Singapore, Malaysia, Australia, Netherlands, US, UK, and Arabic countries make flourish this village. Emigration and expatriation from this village is not uncommon since British rule.

== Amenities ==
Mannankadu has all amenities necessary for a progressive village. It has one middle school, one primary school and a post office. Post office, drinking water supplied from overhead tanks, land and mobile telephone connections are the other civic facilities in the village. State Highway 66 is the primary road connection for the villagers.

The nearest railway station is Pattukkottai, situated at a distance of 10 km from this village. It is well Connected by road to other parts of the state, so this village is easily accessible.

== Culture ==
People celebrate festivals for Sri Vaazh Munishwarar - Veeranar temple, Sri Pillaiyar koyil (Ganesh temple) and Sri Ini Aandaar temple, Sri Munniayya Temple (West) every year apart from celebrating Pongal, Deepavali, Aayutha Pooja and Kaarthikai.

== History ==
Mannangadu village has a rich history, it had got the name from Lord Rama, who went through this village to reach Sri Lanka. The word Mannan implies the Ayyodhya King Lord Rama. During British rule, it is one of the largest Agraharam village.

== Tourism ==
=== SRI VAAZH MUNISHWARAR TEMPLE ===
Temple is situated in main road of this village. Mother Nalla Kathayi Amman and Vaazh munishwarar are the main god of this temple. This temple is worshipping by many people from different regions of the State and it is famous in Delta region.

=== SRI JADA MUNISHWARAR TEMPLE ===
Temple is situated in the Mela street of this village, nearby this temple small Vinayagar temple is also established.

=== SRI VINAYAGAR TEMPLE ===
Lord Vinayagar is the main god of this temple. It is situated in the South Street of this village on the SH-66. Tamil new year is the festival day of this temple.

=== SRI AYYANAR TEMPLE ===
Temple is situated in the northern border of this village. This village is commonly worshipped by three neighbouring villages, Mannangadu, Regunathapuram and Kasangadu. Lord Meikamudaiya Ayyanar, Poornambikai and Pushkalambikai and Lord Minnadiyar are the main god of this temple. Tamil new year is the festival day of this temple.
