= Vattakudi-North =

- Village
- Location in Tamil Nadu, India Vattakudi-North (India)
- Coordinates: 10.43°N 79.32°E
- Country: India
- State: Tamil Nadu
- District: Thanjavur
- Taluk: Pattukkottai

Government
  - Village Panchayat President: Meiyanathan

Population (2001)
  - Total: 1,317

Languages
  - Official: Tamil
- Time zone: UTC+5:30 (IST)
- PIN: 614613
- Telephone code: 91 4373
- Vehicle registration: TN 49
- Sex ratio: 758 M for 559 F ♂/♀

Vattakudi-North is an agricultural village in Pattukkottai taluk of Thanjavur district, located in the delta of Cauvery river. Pattukottai is the nearest town, which lies some 10 km to the west. Farming and related activities constitute the core economic activity. It comes under Pattukottai legislative constituency and Tanjore Parliament constituency. Vattakudi North is one of the 32 villages of Musugundan Community.

== Population ==
According to the latest census done by Government of India, Vattakudi- North has total population of 2672 in 410 households. 1593 Males and 1079 Females.

== Local administration ==
Vattakudi- North is a designated Panchayat. It is part of the Pattukkottai Assembly constituency with K. Annadurai (DMK) as the MLA.

== Temple ==
Sri Kalyana Supramaniyar Kovil is the main temple in Vattakudi- North and the largest landowner in the village, with more than 2 acres (8,100 m^{2}) of land. A fortnight long festival is celebrated in the month of Mar-Apr panguni uthiram (பங்குனி உத்திரம்).

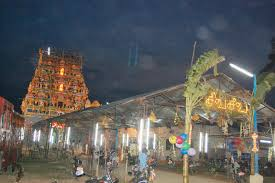
