= Karuppur =

Karuppur may refer to places in India:

- Karuppur, Salem, Tamil Nadu
- Karuppur, Kumbakonam, Thanjavur District, Tamil Nadu
- Karuppur, Pattukkottai taluk, Thanjavur District, Tamil Nadu
- Karuppur, Ariyalur
