= Nattuchalai =

- village
- Location in Tamil Nadu, India Nattuchalai (India)
- Coordinates: 10.4500114°N 79.3500479°E
- Country: India
- State: Tamil Nadu
- District: Thanjavur
- Taluk: Pattukkottai

Population (2001)
  - Total: 3,454

Languages
  - Official: Tamil
- Time zone: UTC+5:30 (IST)

Nattuchalai is a village in the Pattukkottai taluk of Thanjavur district, Tamil Nadu, India. Jayanthi is a president. Jeyaratha Arunagiri is a councilor. Nattuchalai is commonly abbreviated as NTC by the surrounding people.

== Demographics ==
In the 2001 census, Nattuchalai had a total population of 3454 with 1712 males and 1742 females, a sex ratio of 1,018 females per 1,000 males. The literacy rate was 73.77.

It is located along the way from Pattukkottai to Madukkur, and all government facilities except thodakka velanmai kootturavu vanki are available in the village. Nattuchalai official Website has been launched. All official news is displayed on this website, www.nattuchalai.com

A combination of people from various castes live in Nattuchalai, and most villagers are either engineers or farmers. Its main industry is agriculture. The youth of the village enjoy cricket, volleyball and football. Nattuchalai's main festivals are the Sri Ayyanar festival, Mariamman Thiruvizha, Idumban, and the Nallayiamman temple festival.

One of the villages most famous residents is actor Vijayakumar, who has acted in many popular Tamil movies, and has many awards and accolades.
