= R. Srinivasa Ayyar =

Indian politician

Member, Tamil Nadu Legislative Assembly
- In office 1957–1962
- Preceded by: Nadimuthu
- Succeeded by: V. Arunachala Thevar
- Constituency: Pattukkottai

Personal details
- Born: 22 May 1898
- Party: Indian National Congress
- Education: Pachaiappan College, Chennai; Government Law College, Chennai
- Profession: Advocate

R. Srinivasa Ayyar was an Indian politician and former member of the Tamil Nadu Legislative Assembly. He was a resident of Pattukkottai town in the Thanjavur district. Ayyar completed his schooling at Pachaiyappa's School in Chennai, his bachelor's degree at Pachaiyappa's College in Chennai, and his bachelor's law degree at the Government Law College, Chennai. A leading lawyer, he also published a book on law. A member of the Indian National Congress, he was elected as a Member of the Legislative Assembly in the 1957 Tamil Nadu Legislative Assembly election from the Pattukkottai Assembly constituency.

== Electoral performance ==
1957 Madras Legislative Assembly election: Pattukkottai
Party	Candidate	Votes	%	±%
INC	R. Srinivasa Iyer	24,237	43.14%	+1.21
Independent	V. Arunachala Thevar	16,435	29.25%	New
CPI	M. Masilamani	15,513	27.61%	New
Margin of victory		7,802	13.89%	3.20%
Turnout		56,185	62.14%	−0.64%
Registered electors		90,416		
INC hold		Swing	1.21%	
