= Podhu Aavudayar Temple =

Shiva temple in Tamil Nadu, India

Coordinates: 10.38650°N 79.42615°E

Podhu Aavudayar Temple or Madhyapureeswara Temple is a Hindu temple at Parakkalakkottai near Pattukkottai in the Thanjavur district of Tamil Nadu, India. The temple is dedicated to Shiva. The temple is open only on Monday nights at 12 a.m. (Midnight) every week and closes at 3-4 a.m. It is only open on Thai Pongal for morning visits.

== Legend ==
According to Hindu legend, once two sages Vankobar and Mahakobar debated on virtues of brahmacharya and compared it with that of married life. Unable to decide between the two, they prayed to Shiva to act as the judge. Shiva appeared to the sages at Parakkalakkottai and gave his judgement.

== Shrines ==
There are shrines to Shiva, Ganapathi, Vankobar and Mahakobar.
