= P. S. Rajappa =

Indian landlord and politician

Rao Bahadur P. S. Rajappa (24 May 1889 - c. 1954) was an Indian landlord and politician who served as Chairman of the Tanjore (Thanjavur) municipal council from 1924 to 1936, previously having served as president of the Pattukkottai Taluk Board and a member of the Tanjore District Board from 1922 to 1924. He was the hereditary zamindar of Pappanad in Tanjore district. Rajappa Nagar, a residential area in Thanjavur city is named after him.
