= Pulavanchi =

- Village
- Pulavanchi
- Country: India
- State: Tamil Nadu
- District: Thanjavur
- Taluk: Pattukkottai

Languages
  - Official: Tamil
- Time zone: UTC+5:30 (IST)
- PIN: 614903
- Vehicle registration: TN-
- Nearest city: Maddukkur
- Website: pulavanchi.com

Pulavanchi is a village located in Madukkur Panchayat Union, Pattukkottai Taluk, in the Thanjavur District, of the Indian state of Tamil Nadu.

The name Pulavanchi is derived from a combination of pulamai (the name talent) and vanchi (woman), named after people who used to occupy the area. Now, the population is primarily Vellalar, Kallar, Aachariyar, Thevar, Naadar. Paraiyar(dalits).

Kalyanaodai Vaikal splits from Puthu Aru Vaikal that too is separated from Kaveri River by Kallanai Dam rivers. The village is surrounded by fields of crops and coconut trees. There are also many ponds and a large lake. The village is one of 15 selected for the Tamil Nadu Green Village Award.

Ration Shop: under public distribution system - Madukkur Panchayat Union General Distribution Center. Thanjavur District Co-Operative General Distribution Services Limited Post Office

The village is also one of the 36 constituency villages of Musukunda Nadu. In 2018, Cyclone Gaja devastated South India, killing 45 people and causing severe damage. Pulavanchi, was also heavily affected. In response, the government allocated funds.
