= Vadiyakkadu =

Vadiyakkadu Vadiyakkadu Vadiyakkadu
- Country: India
- State: Tamil Nadu
- District: Thanjavur
- Taluk: Pattukkottai

Government
  - Panchayat President: P.Vivek

Population (2001)
  - Total: 1,147

Languages
  - Official: Tamil
- Time zone: UTC+5:30 (IST)
- Postal code: 614903
- Area code: +91 4373
- Vehicle registration: TN49

Vadiyakkadu is a village in the Madukkur Panchayat Union, Pattukkottai taluk of Thanjavur district, Tamil Nadu, India, also known as Vadiyakkadu. It is a small and well developing Village located in southern part of Tamil Nadu. It is 15 km from Pattukkottai. It is surrounded with number of villages. Being in the Cauvery River Delta Area the inhabitants’ main occupation is agriculture. Tamil is the official language and is predominantly spoken.

== Demographics ==
As per the 2001 census, Vadiyakkadu had a total population of 1147 with 580 males and 567 females. The sex ratio was 978. The literacy rate was 71.1.

== Major cultivation ==
Thanjavur is known as the "Rice bowl of Tamil Nadu". Paddy is the crops and the other crops grown are blackgram, banana, coconut, gingelly, ragi, red gram, green gram, sugarcane and maize. The total percentage of land fit for cultivation is 58%. There are three seasons for agriculture in Thanjavur - Kuruvai (June to September), Samba (August to January) and Thaladi (September, October to February, March) but due to lack of water resources maximum area should be planted by coconut trees. Paddy and coconut are the major crops cultivated by Vadiyakkadu people.

== Education ==
There is One Government Primary School located in south street.

== Temples ==
There are five major temples – Vinayagar Temple, Marriyamman Temple, Sivan Kovil, Ayyanar Temple, Munishwarar Temple, and Veeranar Temple.

== Others ==
Political:

Member of Legislative Assembly N.R. Rangarajan (IN Congress)- MLA of Pattukottai. Councillor - M. Sekar (AIADMK, Keelakurichi)

Vadiyakkadu is a part of the Thanjavur Lok Sabha constituency Most of the peoples are supporters of AIADMK, DMK and INC Congress.
