= Andami =

Coordinates: 10°31′N 79°24′E

Andami அண்டமி
- Village
- Interactive map of Andami
- Country: India
- State: Tamil Nadu
- District: Thanjavur

Population (2001)
  - Total: 1,337

Languages
  - Official: Tamil
- Time zone: UTC+5:30 (IST)

Andami is a village in the Madukkur block, Pattukkottai Taluk of Thanjavur district, Tamil Nadu, India.

== Demographics ==
At the 2001 census, Andami had a population of 1,337 with 624 males and 713 females. The literacy rate was 70.5%.
