= A. R. Marimuthu =

Indian politician

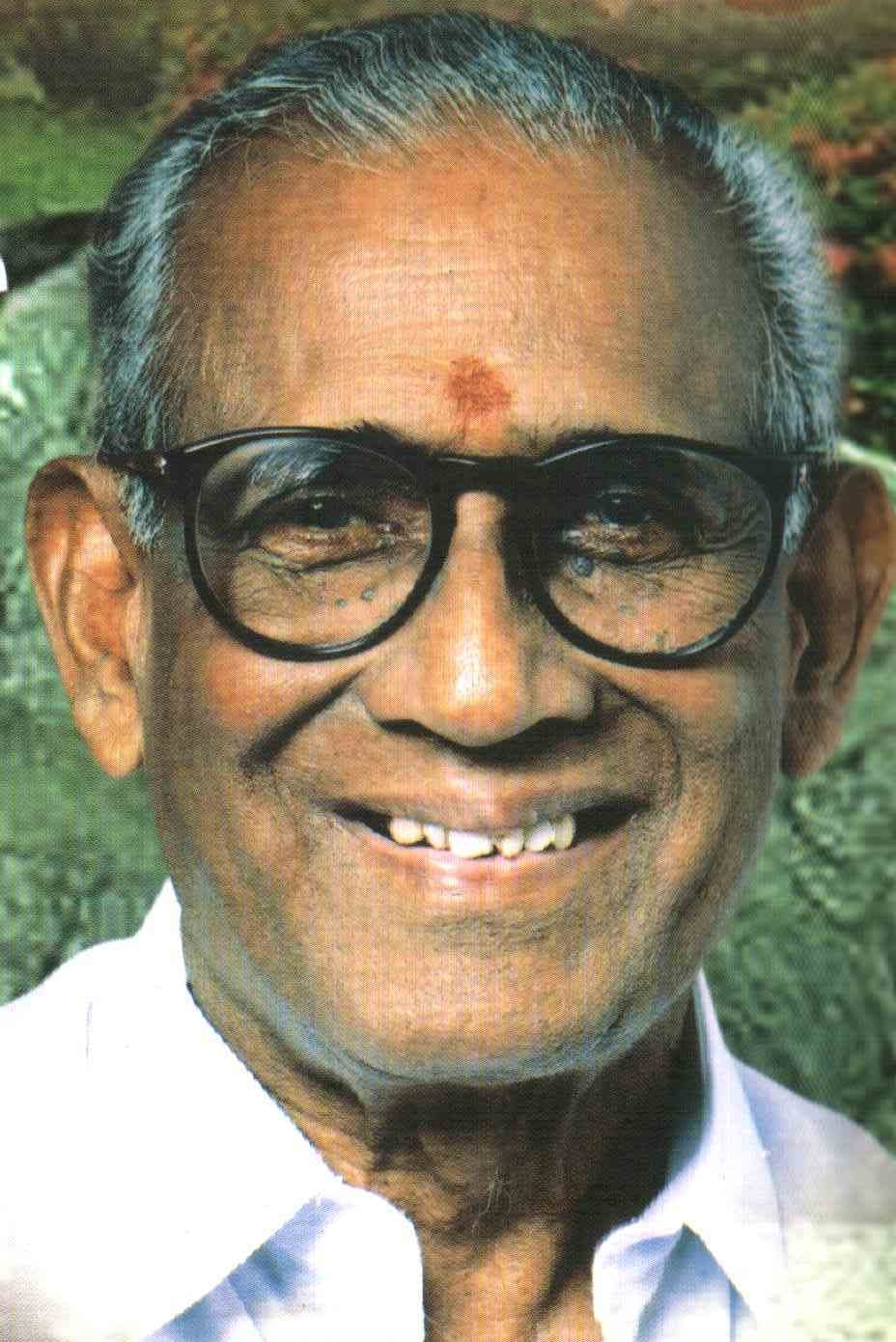

A. R. Marimuthu was an Indian politician and former Member of the Legislative Assembly of Tamil Nadu. He was elected to the Tamil Nadu legislative assembly as a Praja Socialist Party candidate from Adirampattinam constituency in 1957 election. He was elected again as a Praja Socialist Party candidate from Pattukottai constituency in 1967 and 1971 elections. He was elected again as an Indian National Congress candidate from Pattukottai constituency in 1977 election.
