= N. R. Rengarajan =

Indian politician

N.R.Rengarajan

Member of the Tamil Nadu Legislative Assembly
- In office 10 May 2001 – 15 May 2016
- Preceded by: P. Balasubramanian
- Succeeded by: C.V. Sekar
- Constituency: Pattukkottai

Personal details
- Party: Indian National Congress

N. R. Rengarajan is an Indian politician and incumbent Member of the Legislative Assembly of Tamil Nadu. He was elected to the Tamil Nadu legislative assembly as a Tamil Maanila Congress (Moopanar) candidate from Pattukkottai constituency in 2001 election, and as an Indian National Congress candidate in 2006, 2011 election. He was elected three times: 2001, 2006, 2011.

== Electoral performance ==
2021 Tamil Nadu Legislative Assembly election: Pattukkottai
Party	Candidate	Votes	%	±%
DMK	K. Annadurai	79,065	32.16%	New
AIADMK	N. R. Rengarajan	53,796	21.88%	−20.69
Independent	V. Balakrishnan	23,771	9.67%	New
NTK	Keerthika Anbu	10,730	4.36%	+2.59
AMMK	S. D. S. Selvam	5,223	2.12%	New
MNM	B. Sadasivam	3,088	1.26%	New
NOTA	NOTA	1,026	0.42%	−0.51
Margin of victory		25,269	10.28%	2.83%
Turnout		245,832	99.99%	26.97%
Rejected ballots		350	0.14%	
Registered electors		245,863		
DMK gain from AIADMK		Swing	-10.41%	

2011 Tamil Nadu Legislative Assembly election: Pattukkottai
Party	Candidate	Votes	%	±%
INC	N. R. Rengarajan	55,482	37.91%	−8.77
DMDK	N. Senthilkumar	46,703	31.91%	+23.42
Independent	A. R. M. Yoganandam	22,066	15.08%	New
BJP	V. Murali Ganesh	10,164	6.94%	+5.33
Independent	S. Senthilkumar	6,775	4.63%	New
IJK	A. Saravanan	1,424	0.97%	New
Independent	A. Irene	1,358	0.93%	New
Independent	R. Singaravadivelan	1,195	0.82%	New
BSP	C. Inbarasan	1,186	0.81%	−2.31
Margin of victory		8,779	6.00%	−6.18%
Turnout		146,353	78.00%	6.80%
Registered electors		187,627		
INC hold		Swing	-8.77%	

2006 Tamil Nadu Legislative Assembly election: Pattukkottai
Party	Candidate	Votes	%	±%
INC	N. R. Rengarajan	58,776	46.68%	New
MDMK	S. Viswanathan	43,442	34.50%	+26.98
DMDK	N. Senthilkumar	10,688	8.49%	New
Independent	P. Jayabal	6,230	4.95%	New
BSP	S. Thoufeeq	3,931	3.12%	New
BJP	M. Ravi Chandiran	2,029	1.61%	New
AIFB	Chinna. Saminathan	822	0.65%	New
Margin of victory		15,334	12.18%	6.23%
Turnout		125,918	71.20%	10.33%
Registered electors		176,850		
INC gain from TMC(M)		Swing	-0.81%	

2001 Tamil Nadu Legislative Assembly election: Pattukkottai
Party	Candidate	Votes	%	±%
TMC(M)	N. R. Rengarajan	55,474	47.49%	New
DMK	P. Balasubramanian	48,524	41.54%	−17.97
MDMK	R. Elango	8,782	7.52%	−0.71
JP	S. Adikesavan	1,043	0.89%	New
Independent	S. Jahirhussion	980	0.84%	New
Independent	Kumaravel Thangam	833	0.71%	New
Independent	M. R. Chokalinga Solanga Nattar	660	0.56%	New
Margin of victory		6,950	5.95%	−22.68%
Turnout		116,819	60.87%	−10.13%
Registered electors		192,049		
TMC(M) gain from DMK		Swing	-12.02%	
