= Vijayakumar (Tamil actor) =

Indian actor (born 1944)

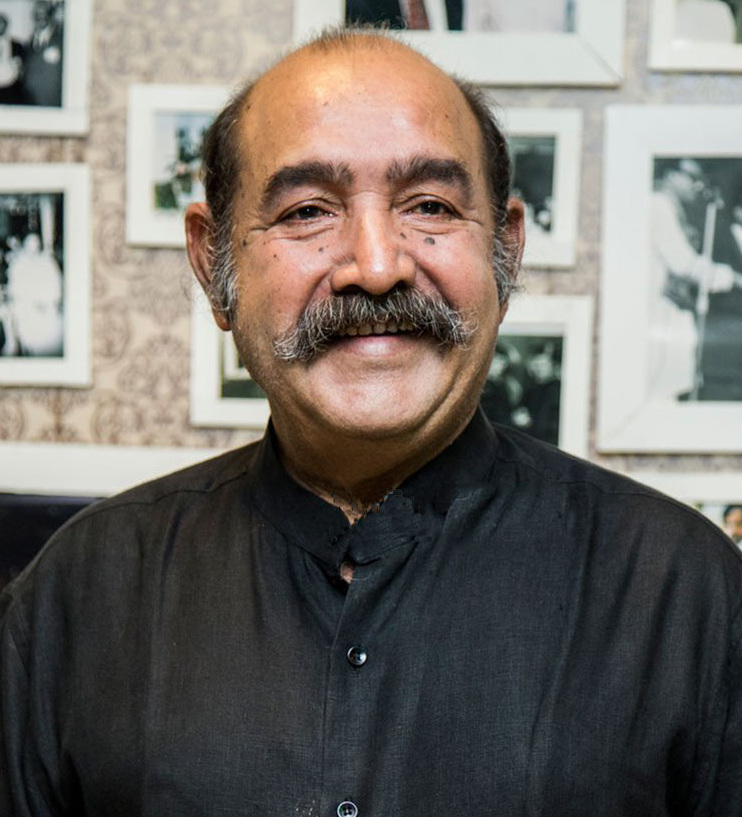
- Vijayakumar at the Book Launch of Idhaya Oli
- Born: Panchaksharam Rangasamy Pillai; 29 August 1943 (age 83); Nattuchalai, Madras Presidency, British India
- Occupation: Actor
- Years active: 1961–present
- Works: Full list
- Political party: Bharatiya Janata Party (2016–present)
- Spouses: Muthukannu (m. 1969); Manjula Vijayakumar (m. 1976; died 2013)
- Children: Kavitha Vijayakumar; Anitha Vijayakumar; Arun Vijay; Pritha Hari; Sridevi Vijaykumar; Vanitha Vijayakumar
- Parents: Rangasamy Pillai (father); Chinnammal (mother)

Panchaksharam Rangasamy Pillai (born 29 August 1943), known professionally as Vijayakumar, is an Indian actor who works in Tamil cinema. He started his film career in the Tamil film Sri Valli (1961) as a child actor and started playing a lead role from the movie Aval Oru Thodar Kathai (1974) then he worked in Madhurageetham (1977) and Azhage Unnai Aarathikkiren (1979). He has also acted in Telugu and Malayalam movies. He also worked in television serials like Thangam, Vamsam, Talambralu, Nandini and Rasaathi. His son is actor Arun Vijay.

== Early life ==
Vijayakumar was born on 29 August 1943 in Nattuchalai, Pattukkottai Taluk, Thanjavur district, Tamil Nadu, India. He belongs to Veerakodi Vellalar Community .His birth name Panchaksharam was changed to Vijayakumar for films. He debuted in the 1961 Tamil movie Sri Valli. Again in 1964, with the help of his uncle, he came to Chennai and tried for roles, but only got a small role in the movie Kandhan Karunai as one of the devargal, arrested by the Asura king, Surapadma. Later in 1973, he got an offer to act in a major film role. His first major role was in Kailasam Balachander's Aval Oru Thodar Kathai in 1974.

== Professional career ==
His journey in filmdom began as a child actor in the film Sri Valli in 1961. Vijayakumar was the little Lord Murugan in Sri Valli, starring Sivaji Ganesan and Padmini. Though not many offers were forthcoming for the little actor, he was supposed to play Lord Murugan in Kandhan Karunai (1967), but instead Sivakumar played that role. Vijayakumar acted in a small role as one of the Lords that was arrested by Surapadman. In 1973, Vijayakumar got his first break in Ponnukku Thanga Manasu, directed by Devaraj–Mohan. The other hero in the film was Sivakumar. The success of Ponnuku Thanga Manasu got him a permanent place in Tamil cinema. Vijayakumar was an actor the seventies, who acted alongside leading actors such as Sivaji Ganesan in Dheepam (1977), with M. G. Ramachandran in Indru Pol Endrum Vaazhga (1977) and Kamal Haasan in Neeya? (1979). While Vijayakumar was a supporting actor, he did play the lead role during the 1970s, in films such as Aval Oru Thodar Kathai (1974), Madhura Geetham (1977) and Azhage Unnai Aarathikkiren (1979).

Vijayakumar continued to act in supporting roles in the early 1980s. After a brief slump, Vijayakumar's second innings came in 1988 with Mani Ratnam's Agni Natchathiram (1988), where he played Prabhu and Karthik's father. The movie told the story of two half brothers who fight for their father's love and property. During the 1990s, Vijayakumar was frequently seen in father roles such as Nattamai (1994) and Baashha (1995). During the same time, Vijayakumar also played lead roles in award-winning films such as Kizhakku Cheemayile (1993) and Anthimanthaarai (1996), with Bharathiraaja. The latter took him close to winning the National Film Award for Best Actor, eventually missing it by one vote. Vijayakumar continued to play senior roles during the 2000s; eventually the actor was seen in more grandfather roles. In the last few years, the actor has reduced his film commitments and focused on television serials. Vijayakumar has acted in over 400 films, primarily in Tamil, but also had brief stints in Telugu cinema.

== Personal life ==
Vijayakumar's family consists of wives Muthukannu and Manjula, daughters Kavitha and Anitha and son Arun Vijay from his first wife, and daughters Vanitha, Preetha and Sridevi from his second wife. So far, Arun and his father have appeared together on screen five times – in Pandavar Bhoomi, Malai Malai, Maanja Velu, Kuttram 23, and Oh My Dog. On 23 July 2013, Manjula died in Chennai at the age of 59.

He was the vice-president of Nadigar Sangam until 18 October 2015. He was also a member of the All India Anna Dravida Munnetra Kazhagam. On 16 March 2016, he joined the Bharatiya Janata Party, in the presence of the Union Minister of State for Road Transport, Highways, and Shipping. Pon Radhakrishnan said he would campaign for the party for this Assembly election.

== Awards ==
Cinema Express Award

- 1991 – Cinema Express Award for Best Character Actor – Cheran Pandian

Tamil Nadu State Film Awards

- 1993 – Tamil Nadu State Film Award Special Prize – Kizhakku Cheemayile
- 1996 – Tamil Nadu State Film Award Special Prize – Anthimanthaarai
