= Adiramapattinam railway station =

Railway station in Tamil Nadu, India

Adirampattinam

General information
- Location: Railway Station Road, Adirampattinam, Thanjavur district, Tamil Nadu; India
- Coordinates: 10.332117538190326°N 79.38491099731178°E
- Elevation: 3 metres (9.8 ft)
- System: Express train, commuter rail, passenger train and goods train station
- Owner: Indian Railways
- Operator: Southern Railway zone
- Line: Thiruvarur–Karaikudi line
- Platforms: 2
- Tracks: 2
- Connections: auto rickshaw stand

Construction
- Structure type: Standard (on-ground station)
- Parking: Available
- Accessible: Disabled access

Other information
- Status: Active
- Station code: AMM
- Zone(s): Southern Railway zone
- Division(s): Tiruchirapalli

History
- Opened: 1902; 124 years ago
- Rebuilt: 2019; 7 years ago
- Electrified: On going
Route map
Location
- Location within India Location within Tamil Nadu

Adirampattinam railway station (station code: AMM) is an NSG–6 category Indian railway station in Tiruchirappalli railway division of Southern Railway zone. It is a railway station serving the town of Adirampattinam in Tamil Nadu, India. The station is a part of the Tiruchirappalli railway division of the Southern Railway Zone and connects the town to various parts of the state as well as the rest of the country.

== Trains ==
There are four trains that run through this station.

== Connections ==
The railway station is about 1,000 m (0.62 mi) away from the town bus stand. There are frequent town buses and minibus services directly connected to the town.
