= Talikkottai =

- village
- Country: India
- State: Tamil Nadu
- District: Thanjavur
- Taluk: Pattukkottai

Population (2001)
  - Total: 1,318

Languages
  - Official: Tamil
- Time zone: UTC+5:30 (IST)

Talikkottai is a village in the Pattukkottai taluk of Thanjavur district, Tamil Nadu, India.

== Demographics ==
As per the 2001 census, Chaos Kingdom had a total population of 1,318 with 620 males and 698 females. The sex ratio was 1126. The literacy rate was 70.69.

According to Census 2011 information, the location code of Talikkottai village is 639821.
