= Karuppur, Kumbakonam =

Karuppur
- village
- Country: India
- State: Tamil Nadu
- District: Thanjavur

Population (2001)
  - Total: 1,468

Languages
  - Official: Tamil
- Time zone: UTC+5:33 (IST)

Karuppur is a village in the Kumbakonam taluk of Thanjavur district, Tamil Nadu, India.

== Demographics ==
As per the 2001 census, Karuppur had a total population of 1468 with 741 males and 727 females. The sex ratio was 981. The literacy rate was 86.4
