= Avaikkottai =

Coordinates: 10°20′47″N 79°22′56″E

Avaikkottai Avikkottai
- village
- Interactive map of Avaikkottai
- Country: India
- State: Tamil Nadu
- District: Thanjavur

Population (2001)
  - Total: 1,291

Languages
  - Official: Tamil
- Time zone: UTC+5:30 (IST)
- PIN: 614015
- Telephone code: +914367
- Vehicle registration: TN49

Avikkottai is a village in the Pattukkottai taluk of Thanjavur district, Tamil Nadu, India.

== Demographics ==
As per the 2001 census, Avikkottai had a total population of 1291 with 636 males and 655 females. The sex ratio was 1030. The literacy rate was 83.17.
