= Kaniyakurichi =

- village
- Country: India
- State: Tamil Nadu
- District: Thanjavur

Population (2001)
  - Total: 1,060

Languages
  - Official: Tamil
- Time zone: UTC+5:30 (IST)

Kaniyakurichi is a village in the Pattukkottai taluk of Thanjavur district, Tamil Nadu, India.

== Demographics ==
As per the 2001 census, Kaniyakurichi had a total population of 1060 with 534 males and 526 females. The sex ratio was 985. The literacy rate was 82.35.
