= Bavajikkottai =

Coordinates: 10°31′N 79°27′E

Bavajikkottai Baloji Ragunadha Samuthiran
- village
- Interactive map of Bavajikkottai
- Country: India
- State: Tamil Nadu
- District: Thanjavur

Population (2001)
  - Total: 853

Languages
  - Official: Tamil
- Time zone: UTC+5:30 (IST)

Bavajikkottai is a village in the Pattukkottai taluk of Thanjavur district, Tamil Nadu, India.

== Demographics ==
As per the 2001 census, Bavajikkottai had a total population of 853 with 412 males and 441 females. The sex ratio was 1070. The literacy rate was 68.81.
