= Pattukkottai Assembly constituency =

One of the 234 State Legislative Assembly Constituencies in Tamil Nadu, in India

Coordinates: 10.43°N 79.32°E

Pattukkottai
- Constituency No. 176 for the Tamil Nadu Legislative Assembly

Constituency details
- Country: India
- Region: South India
- State: Tamil Nadu
- District: Thanjavur
- Lok Sabha constituency: Thanjavur
- Established: 1951
- Total electors: 2,42,451
- Reservation: None

Member of Legislative Assembly
- 17th Tamil Nadu Legislative Assembly
- Incumbent Annadurai K
- Party: DMK
- Elected year: 2026

Pattukottai is a state assembly constituency in Tamil Nadu. It is one of the 234 State Legislative Assembly Constituencies in Tamil Nadu, in India. Elections and winners from this constituency are listed below.

As per the 2010 draft electoral rolls released by the election commission, Pattukottai Assembly constituency comprises 1,77,798 voters (85,476 male and 83,902 female). Besides Pattukkottai Municipality, the Assembly segment includes Madukkur Town Panchayat, Adirampattinam Town Panchayat and a number of villages.

== History ==
Pattukkottai Assembly constituency has been a part of Thanjavur Lok Sabha constituency since the 2008 delimitation. Prior to that, it fell within Pudukkottai Lok Sabha constituency.

== Members of Legislative Assembly ==
Year	Member	Political party
Madras State
1952	Nadimuthu Pillai	Indian National Congress
1957	R. Srinivasa Ayyar	Indian National Congress
1962	V. Arunachala Thevar	Dravida Munnetra Kazhagam
1967	A. R. Marimuthu	Praja Socialist Party
Tamil Nadu
1971	A. R. Marimuthu	Praja Socialist Party
1977	A. R. Marimuthu	Indian National Congress
1980	S. D. Somasundaram	All India Anna Dravida Munnetra Kazhagam
1984	P. N. Ramachandran	All India Anna Dravida Munnetra Kazhagam
1989	K. Annadurai	Dravida Munnetra Kazhagam
1991	K. Balasubramaniam	All India Anna Dravida Munnetra Kazhagam
1996	P. Balasubramanian	Dravida Munnetra Kazhagam
2001	N. R. Rengarajan	Tamil Maanila Congress
2006	N. R. Rengarajan	Indian National Congress
2011	N. R. Rengarajan	Indian National Congress
2016	C. V. Sekar	All India Anna Dravida Munnetra Kazhagam
2021	K. Annadurai	Dravida Munnetra Kazhagam
2026	K. Annadurai	Dravida Munnetra Kazhagam

== Election results ==
Vote share of winning candidates
2026	35.90%
2021	44.90%
2016	42.58%
2011	37.91%
2006	46.68%
2001	47.49%
1996	59.51%
1991	62.07%
1989	37.19%
1984	51.04%
1980	54.96%
1977	30.13%
1971	62.95%
1967	54.60%
1962	44.39%
1957	43.14%
1952	41.93%

=== 2026 ===
2026 Tamil Nadu Legislative Assembly election: Pattukkottai
Party	Candidate	Votes	%	±%
DMK	Annadurai K	65,963	35.90	▼9.00
TVK	Mathan C	52,209	28.41	New
AIADMK	Sekar C V	49,575	26.98	▼3.52
NTK	Kannan S	13,145	7.15	▲1.05
NOTA	NOTA	738	0.40	▼0.02
PT	Gurumoorthy M	521	0.28	New
Independent	Annadurai C N	382	0.21	New
Independent	Ziaudeen A J	289	0.16	New
Independent	Mohamed Sharif M	250	0.14	New
Independent	Muthukumar D	240	0.13	New
Independent	Suresh M R	238	0.13	New
Independent	Suresh R	195	0.11	New
Margin of victory		13,754	7.49	▼6.91
Turnout		1,83,745	75.79	▼0.01
Registered electors		2,42,451		▲8,777
DMK hold		Swing	▼9.00	

=== 2021 ===
2021 Tamil Nadu Legislative Assembly election: Pattukkottai
Party	Candidate	Votes	%	±%
DMK	K. Annadurai	79,065	44.9	New
AIADMK	N. R. Rengarajan	53,796	30.5	
Independent	V. Balakrishnan	23,771	13.5	New
NTK	Keerthika Anbu	10,730	6.1	
AMMK	S. D. S. Selvam	5,223	3	New
MNM	B. Sadasivam	3,088	1.8	New
NOTA	NOTA	1,026	0.42%	
Margin of victory		25,269	10.28%	2.83%
Turnout		176,174	75.8	
Rejected ballots		350	0.14%	
Registered electors		233,674		
DMK gain from AIADMK		Swing	-10.41%	

=== 2016 ===
2016 Tamil Nadu Legislative Assembly election: Pattukkottai
Party	Candidate	Votes	%	±%
AIADMK	C V sekar	70,631	42.58%	New
INC	K. Mahendran	58,273	35.13%	−2.78
DMDK	N. Senthil Kumar	11,231	6.77%	−25.14
BJP	M. Muruganantham	11,039	6.65%	−0.29
SDPI	Z. Mohamed Iliyas	3,923	2.36%	New
PMK	C. Lakshmi	3,607	2.17%	New
NTK	K. Geetha	2,940	1.77%	New
NOTA	NOTA	1,541	0.93%	New
Independent	K. Sanjai Gandhi	1,103	0.66%	New
SS	C. Kubendran	1,089	0.66%	New
Margin of victory		12,358	7.45%	1.45%
Turnout		165,890	73.02%	−4.98%
Registered electors		227,191		
AIADMK gain from INC		Swing	4.67%	

=== 2011 ===
2011 Tamil Nadu Legislative Assembly election: Pattukkottai
Party	Candidate	Votes	%	±%
INC	N. R. Rengarajan	55,482	37.91%	−8.77
DMDK	N. Senthilkumar	46,703	31.91%	+23.42
Independent	A. R. M. Yoganandam	22,066	15.08%	New
BJP	V. Murali Ganesh	10,164	6.94%	+5.33
Independent	S. Senthilkumar	6,775	4.63%	New
IJK	A. Saravanan	1,424	0.97%	New
Independent	A. Irene	1,358	0.93%	New
Independent	R. Singaravadivelan	1,195	0.82%	New
BSP	C. Inbarasan	1,186	0.81%	−2.31
Margin of victory		8,779	6.00%	−6.18%
Turnout		146,353	78.00%	6.80%
Registered electors		187,627		
INC hold		Swing	-8.77%	

=== 2006 ===
2006 Tamil Nadu Legislative Assembly election: Pattukkottai
Party	Candidate	Votes	%	±%
INC	N. R. Rengarajan	58,776	46.68%	New
MDMK	S. Viswanathan	43,442	34.50%	+26.98
DMDK	N. Senthilkumar	10,688	8.49%	New
Independent	P. Jayabal	6,230	4.95%	New
BSP	S. Thoufeeq	3,931	3.12%	New
BJP	M. Ravi Chandiran	2,029	1.61%	New
AIFB	Chinna. Saminathan	822	0.65%	New
Margin of victory		15,334	12.18%	6.23%
Turnout		125,918	71.20%	10.33%
Registered electors		176,850		
INC gain from TMC(M)		Swing	-0.81%	

=== 2001 ===
2001 Tamil Nadu Legislative Assembly election: Pattukkottai
Party	Candidate	Votes	%	±%
TMC(M)	N. R. Rengarajan	55,474	47.49%	New
DMK	P. Balasubramanian	48,524	41.54%	−17.97
MDMK	R. Elango	8,782	7.52%	−0.71
JP	S. Adikesavan	1,043	0.89%	New
Independent	S. Jahirhussion	980	0.84%	New
Independent	Kumaravel Thangam	833	0.71%	New
Independent	M. R. Chokalinga Solanga Nattar	660	0.56%	New
Margin of victory		6,950	5.95%	−22.68%
Turnout		116,819	60.87%	−10.13%
Registered electors		192,049		
TMC(M) gain from DMK		Swing	-12.02%	

=== 1996 ===
1996 Tamil Nadu Legislative Assembly election: Pattukkottai
Party	Candidate	Votes	%	±%
DMK	P. Balasubramanian	69,880	59.51%	+23.76
AIADMK	Baskaran Seeni	36,259	30.88%	−31.19
MDMK	G. Renganathan	9,656	8.22%	New
BJP	K. M. Namachivayam	1,268	1.08%	New
Margin of victory		33,621	28.63%	2.31%
Turnout		117,423	71.00%	3.42%
Registered electors		171,478		
DMK gain from AIADMK		Swing	-2.56%	

=== 1991 ===
1991 Tamil Nadu Legislative Assembly election: Pattukkottai
Party	Candidate	Votes	%	±%
AIADMK	K. Balasubramaniam	67,764	62.07%	+38.42
DMK	K. Annadurai	39,028	35.75%	−1.44
PMK	C. Rengasamy	857	0.79%	New
JP	Saminathan Chinna	673	0.62%	New
Margin of victory		28,736	26.32%	13.08%
Turnout		109,169	67.58%	−9.96%
Registered electors		166,059		
AIADMK gain from DMK		Swing	24.88%	

=== 1989 ===
1989 Tamil Nadu Legislative Assembly election: Pattukkottai
Party	Candidate	Votes	%	±%
DMK	K. Annadurai	41,224	37.19%	+1.43
INC	A. R. Marimuthu	26,543	23.94%	New
AIADMK	S. Baskaran	26,215	23.65%	−27.39
AIADMK	P. N. Ramachandran	8,801	7.94%	−43.1
Independent	K. Raman	7,390	6.67%	New
Independent	M. R. Chokkalingam	679	0.61%	New
Margin of victory		14,681	13.24%	−2.04%
Turnout		110,852	77.54%	−2.61%
Registered electors		145,353		
DMK gain from AIADMK		Swing	-13.85%	

=== 1984 ===
1984 Tamil Nadu Legislative Assembly election: Pattukkottai
Party	Candidate	Votes	%	±%
AIADMK	P. N. Ramachandran	50,493	51.04%	−3.92
DMK	A. V. Subramanian	35,376	35.76%	New
INC(J)	S. D. Somasundaram	12,111	12.24%	New
BJP	K. M. Namasivayam	509	0.51%	New
Margin of victory		15,117	15.28%	4.27%
Turnout		98,923	80.14%	−1.07%
Registered electors		129,067		
AIADMK hold		Swing	-3.92%	

=== 1980 ===
1980 Tamil Nadu Legislative Assembly election: Pattukkottai
Party	Candidate	Votes	%	±%
AIADMK	S. D. Somasundaram	52,900	54.96%	+25.89
INC	A. R. Marimuthu	42,302	43.95%	+13.82
JP	N. Mathivanan	1,047	1.09%	New
Margin of victory		10,598	11.01%	9.95%
Turnout		96,249	81.21%	6.30%
Registered electors		119,533		
AIADMK gain from INC		Swing	24.83%	

=== 1977 ===
1977 Tamil Nadu Legislative Assembly election: Pattukkottai
Party	Candidate	Votes	%	±%
INC	A. R. Marimuthu	25,993	30.13%	−6.92
AIADMK	V. R. K. Palaniapan	25,082	29.08%	New
DMK	R. Srinivasan	24,142	27.99%	New
JP	R. Ramasamy	9,227	10.70%	New
Independent	V. Chandrasekaran	1,100	1.28%	New
Independent	N. Kulandaiyan	719	0.83%	New
Margin of victory		911	1.06%	−24.84%
Turnout		86,263	74.91%	−5.88%
Registered electors		116,450		
INC gain from PSP		Swing	-32.82%	

=== 1971 ===
1971 Tamil Nadu Legislative Assembly election: Pattukkottai
Party	Candidate	Votes	%	±%
PSP	A. R. Marimuthu	44,565	62.95%	New
INC	N. Nagarajan	26,229	37.05%	−6.47
Margin of victory		18,336	25.90%	14.82%
Turnout		70,794	80.79%	−4.75%
Registered electors		92,580		
PSP hold		Swing	8.36%	

=== 1967 ===
1967 Madras Legislative Assembly election: Pattukkottai
Party	Candidate	Votes	%	±%
PSP	A. R. Marimuthu	35,198	54.60%	New
INC	N. Ramasamy	28,056	43.52%	+7.14
Independent	M. P. Vaithianathan	1,217	1.89%	New
Margin of victory		7,142	11.08%	3.07%
Turnout		64,471	85.54%	8.61%
Registered electors		79,109		
PSP gain from DMK		Swing	10.21%	

=== 1962 ===
1962 Madras Legislative Assembly election: Pattukkottai
Party	Candidate	Votes	%	±%
DMK	V. Arunachala Thevar	35,151	44.39%	New
INC	R. Srinivasa Iyer	28,806	36.38%	−6.76
CPI	M. Masilamani	15,234	19.24%	−8.37
Margin of victory		6,345	8.01%	−5.87%
Turnout		79,191	76.93%	14.79%
Registered electors		107,011		
DMK gain from INC		Swing	1.25%	

=== 1957 ===
1957 Madras Legislative Assembly election: Pattukkottai
Party	Candidate	Votes	%	±%
INC	R. Srinivasa Iyer	24,237	43.14%	+1.21
Independent	V. Arunachala Thevar	16,435	29.25%	New
CPI	M. Masilamani	15,513	27.61%	New
Margin of victory		7,802	13.89%	3.20%
Turnout		56,185	62.14%	−0.64%
Registered electors		90,416		
INC hold		Swing	1.21%	

=== 1952 ===
1952 Madras Legislative Assembly election: Pattukkottai
Party	Candidate	Votes	%	±%
INC	Nadimuthu Pillai	21,372	41.93%	New
Socialist Party (India)	Marimuthu	15,926	31.24%	New
Independent	V. Ramaswami Thevar	11,577	22.71%	New
Independent	D. D. Dhasan	2,100	4.12%	New
Margin of victory		5,446	10.68%	
Turnout		50,975	62.78%	
Registered electors		81,195		
INC win (new seat)				
