= S. D. Somasundaram =

Indian politician (1923-2001)

Thiru S.D.S

Thiru Sendankadu D. Somasundaram (25 February 1930 - 6 December 2001) also known as S.D.S., was a political leader and administrator who served as a cabinet minister of the Tamil Nadu state.

== Early life and background ==
Somasundaram was born in the village of Sendankadu near Pattukottai into an agricultural family. He was an active social worker and was associated with various social organizations. He pursued a bachelor of engineering (BEng) in mechanical engineering from Annamalai University. He was an athlete and played football in college. He also participated in a marathon race, representing Tamil Nadu. After graduating, Thiru started working as an assistant engineer in the public works department.

Thiru S.D.S. began his political career as an activist of the Dravidar Kazhagam in 1947 and joined the D.M.K. when the late C.N. Annadurai founded the party in 1949. He was first elected to parliament from the Thanjavur Lok Sabha constituency in Tamil Nadu in 1967 after defeating R. Venkataraman of the Indian National Congress, the former president of India. He was re-elected from the same constituency in 1971 and 1977 on DMK and AIADMK tickets, respectively.

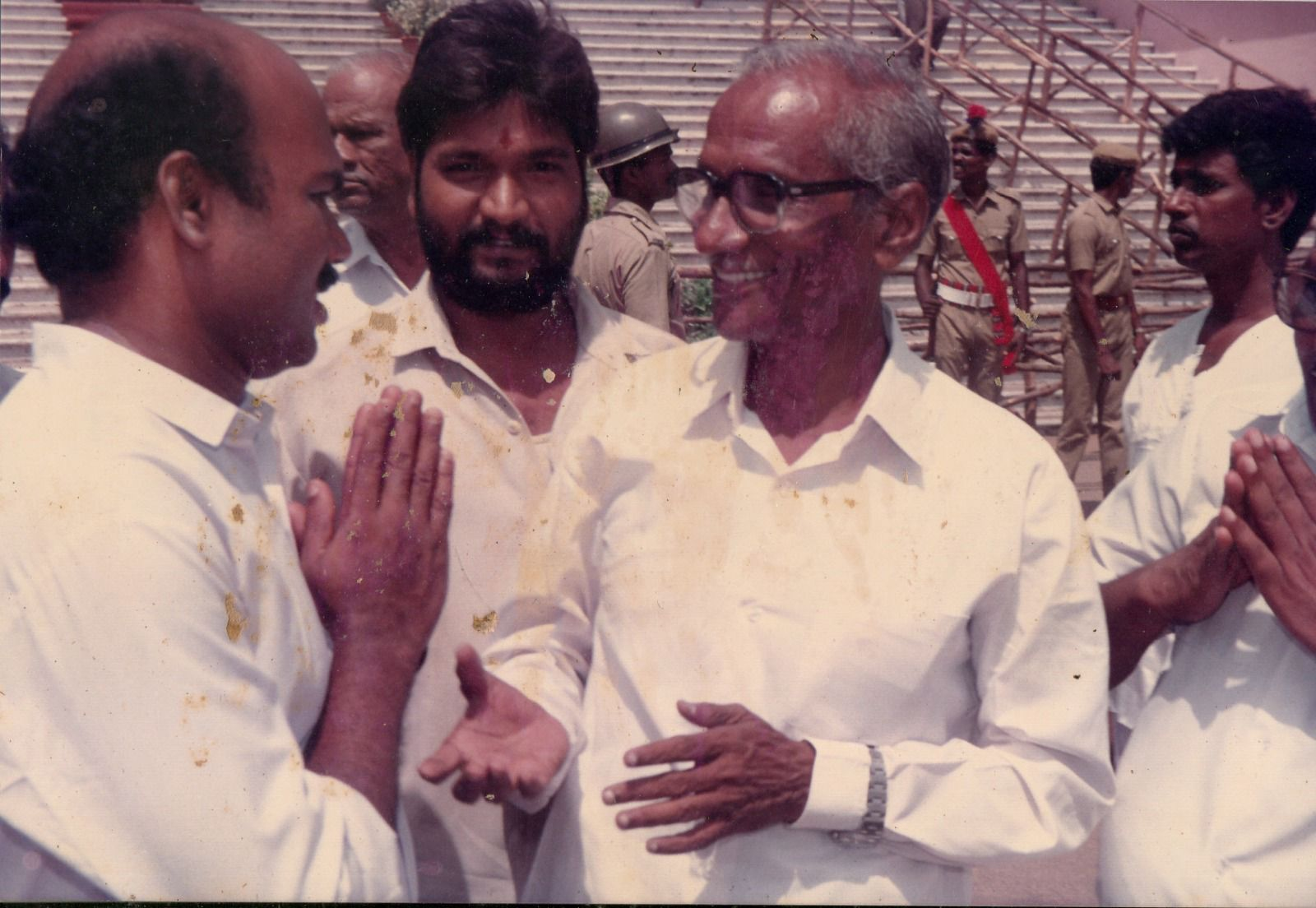
Somasundaram with AIADMK functionaries

In 1972, he was among the first to leave the D.M.K., along with M.G. Ramachandran (M.G.R.). He was considered by the AIADMK middle- and lower-level workers as a simple man who connected with them and was also known as an honest politician. M.G.R. held the activities of S.D.S. much closer to his heart. He resigned from his M.P. post in 1977 and was nominated to the now-defunct legislative council.

S.D.S. served as a member of the joint committee on salaries and allowances of Members of Parliament during 1971–72, the committee on Private Members' bills and resolutions during 1973–74, the House Committee in 1977, and the General Purposes Committee during 1977–78. He was the first insider to question M.G.R. about the widespread corruption during his term as chief minister. As a result of differences that existed between him and M.G.R., he decided to quit AIADMK and floated his party "Namathu Kazhagam," meaning "Our Party." Later, he quickly folded his new party due to a lack of mass appeal and returned to the AIADMK to be in J. Jayalalithaa's camp and served as revenue minister from 1991 to 1996.

Somasundaram was in charge of conducting the 8th Tamil World Conference at Thanjavur during his tenure as the revenue minister. Subsequently, due to a difference of opinion with J. Jayalalithaa, he quit AIADMK again and floated another party called "Puratchi Thalaivar AIADMK."

Somasundaram died on December 6, 2001, in Chennai, aged 79.

== Personal life ==
Perarignar Anna officiated the marriage of S.D.S. with Sakunthala on December 6, 1962, in the presence of Dravidian party members. Anna referred to S.D.S. as his fraternal brother and was proud to preside over the wedlock. The couple has two sons. Their eldest son, Duraimanickam, works with the Chennai Port Trust as a "superintendent engineer," and the younger son, S.D.S., is a correspondent and political figure.

== Education and political life ==
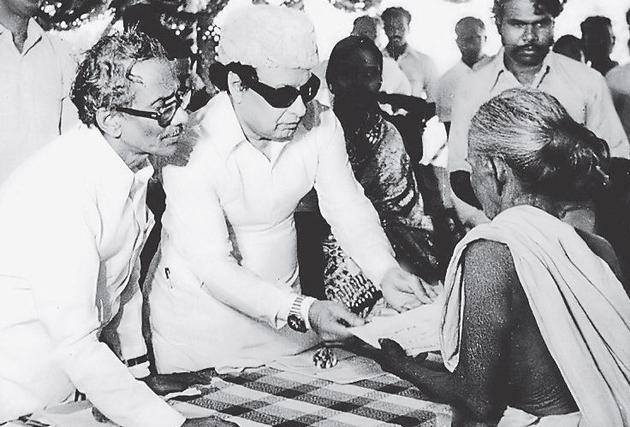
S.D.S. Ayya with Dr.M.G.R

Somasundaram is a former member of parliament and revenue minister of the government of Tamil Nadu. He was formerly the general secretary of the "Dravida Maanavar Munnetra Kazhagam" (the student's wing of Dravida Munnetra Kazhagam, DMK), propaganda secretary of "Anna Dravida Munnetra Kazhagam (ADMK)," deputy general secretary of All India Anna Dravida Munnetra Kazhagam (AIADMK), founder leader of "Namadhu Kazhagam," and founder leader of "Puratchi Thalaivar Anna Dravida Munnetra Kazhagam."

The rational thoughts of Thanthai Periyar and the reformative orations of leader Perarignar Anna inspired S.D.S., who joined their "self-respect movement" at an early age and committed to following them in their efforts to eradicate untouchability, improve the wellbeing of the downtrodden, and promote equality among people of various educational and economic groups in society, aiming for harmony among the Dravidian people.

When Thanthai Periyar undertook the leadership of "Dravidar Kazhagam" in 1944, S.D.S., as a high school student, stood to form "Orathanadu Manavar Dravidar Kazhagam," attending in a black shirt and recruiting other students into the 'self-respect movement'.

In 1949, S.D.S. followed Perarignar Anna and joined his DMK. S.D.S. was later made the first "general secretary of the Dravida Maanavar Munnetra Kazhagam (DMMK)." He continued as the general secretary for 13 years.

As general secretary of DMMK and student of Annamalai University, S.D.S. successfully conducted fourteen state DMMK conferences, which sowed anti-Hindi agitation into the young student community.

S.D.S. purposefully prolonged his engineering course duration to thirteen years at Annamalai University to propagate the ideologies of DMK to the student community of the university year after year. During the DMK conference held at Annamalai Nagar as general secretary of DMMK, S.D.S. contributed Rs. 1111 to perarignar Anna towards legal expenses for the Tuticorin case.

After India gained independence, the separate colonies of zamindars and kingdoms were merged with this country under the action of Sardar Vallabai Patel, also known as the "Iron Man of India." When separate states were formed geographically and linguistically in 1956, M.P. Sivagnanam (MAA. PO. SI) fought for the provincial autonomy of Tamil people and Tamil Nadu. However, S.D.S., as a student, brought in student support for the separate Dravida Naadu policy of "Perarignar Anna."

In Perarignar Anna's weekly Tamil magazines "Diravida Naadu" and "Kaanchi," he founded an English weekly under the title "Homeland" in 1957. To have the weekly magazine released, students of Annamalai University, under the leadership of S.D.S., contributed 10,000 rupees to "Perarignar Anna."

During the Indochina Wars, S.D.S. gave away the marriage gifts and cash to "Perarignar Anna" to be given as war funds. Seeing her husband's national outlook, Sakunthala Ammal also gave away all her wedding gifts and money for the war fund.

The anti-Hindi agitation took an aggressive step with the participation of the "Tamil Nadu Students Anti-Hindi Federation" in 1965. When the federation needed financial support, it approached S.D.S.. As a government servant, he could not spare money; hence he gave the jewels of his wife, Ms. Sakunthala Ammal, for the success of that language war.

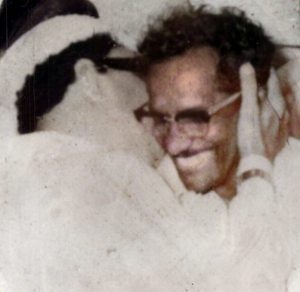
S.D.S. Ayya with Dr.M.G.R

In 1969, "Perarignar Anna" died, leaving the whole of Tamil Nadu in sorrow. After his death, there began internal turmoil and chaos among the second-line leaders of the DMK. As a result of this, "Puratchi Thalaivar, Mr. M.G. Ramachandran" (MGR) was expelled from DMK. With the large support of the people, Puratchi Thalaivar MGR launched his political outfit "Anna Dravida Munnetra Kazhagam (ADMK)" on October 17, 1972, which is now called "All India Anna Dravida Munnetra Kazhagam (AIADMK)."

S.D.S. joined the Anna DMK as the first Lok Sabha member. Along with him, S.D.S. streamed into the new Democratic Party with many of his political followers from various other parties. Since then, S.D.S. has worked to fight against the DMK, who was in power at the time, bearing a name for corruption. S.D.S. put forth his full effort to form and frame the new party from the grassroots level. He donated his wealth and belongings to people's wellness and to funding the Tamil Nadu government.

In 1973, a by-election was called for the "Dindigul" Lok Sabha constituency. Since it was just a few months before the beginning of ADMK, there was some hesitancy to contest the elections among the party's frontline leaders, but Puratchi Thalaivar, MGR, contested the polls. He took confidence in the propaganda secretary of AIADMK, SD Somasundaram, and made him the organizing head person of the election campaign. ADMK won the elections and got political acceptance from the people of Tamil Nadu.

This victory drew S.D.S. closer to Puratchi Thalaivar MGR, and they had an understanding thereon. Puratchi Thalaivar, MGR, had SD Somasundaram as his loyal associate. Later, "Puratchi Thalaivar MGR" gave S.D.S. a cabinet berth as revenue minister of Tamil Nadu.

"Puratchi Thalaivar MGR" once referred to S.D.S. as the "honest and clean minister who adds revenue only to the government and not a penny for himself in the Tamil Nadu assembly". People still refer to him as a clean politician.

After the death of "Puratchi Thalaivar MGR in 1987, the political scenario in Tamil Nadu was uncertain, and AIADMK split into two factions: AIADMK (JA) under Ms. Janaki Ammal and AIADMK (J) under "Puratchi Thalaivi J. Jayalalitha". SD Somasundaram took the leadership of Puratchi Thalaivi Amma and added strength to the split party after the death of Janaki Amma.

Somasundaram played an important part in reconvening the followers of Puratchi Thalaivar MGR, who were stranded after the death of Puratchi Thalaivar MGR. This work of S.D.S. to regain the popularity of the split AIADMK impressed Puratchi Thalaivi Amma, and she was given the second position at the party level. S.D.S. toiled to fight and won the elections in 1991 under the superlative leadership of Puratchi Thalaivi Amma. This made him the loyal lieutenant of Puratchi Thalaivi Amma till his last days.

Puratchi Thalaivi Amma mentioned S.D.S. in her words during her speech at the eighth "World Tamil Conference 1995" held in Thanjavur. "SD Somasundaram is someone who never falls tired or sheds away from party work all around the clock. He is a person who always thinks about the AIADMK party and the welfare of the people of Tamil Nadu. Now I call only S.D.S. my brother". These were the words of Puratchi Thalaivi Amma about SD Somasundaram. The closeness between them irked the eyes of others, who brought the difference of opinion among them during S.D.S.'s last days.

== Namathu kazhagam ==
S.D.S. worked on the development of the AIADMK party and public programs in Tamil Nadu. His standing within the party led to a close professional relationship with M.G. Ramachandran (MGR). This association helped S.D.S. reach high-ranking positions in both the party and the state government. The close professional relationship between M.G. Ramachandran (MGR) and S.D.S. caused tension among other members of the AIADMK party. Disagreements eventually developed between the two men. In 1984, MGR removed S.D.S. from the party.

Aggrieved by this expulsion, S.D.S. started a new political party named “Namadhu Kazhagam.” The party took off with a massive rally at Trichy in 1984. The party contested the general election for Parliament and the Tamil Nadu assembly in 1984 but could not win a single seat. In 1985, S.D.S. regrouped the party and took a massive demonstration and rail roko at Madurai in support of “Tamil EELAM," for which S.D.S. was arrested and remanded along with his followers. In 1986, S.D.S. took up a large procession at “Anna Saalai“ in Chennai and submitted a memorandum to “The Governor" of Tamil Nadu. In 1987, when Puratchi Thalaivar MGR returned from America after treatment on invitation, S.D.S. met Puratchi Thalaivar MGR and merged “Namadhu Kazhagam” with AIADMK.

== Last days ==
Somasundaram died on December 6, 2001, in Chennai, at the age of 79.

== S.D.S. Charitable Trust ==
The S.D.S. Charitable Trust is dedicated to supporting the weaker sections of society with a holistic, sustainable, and diversified approach. This charitable trust was incorporated in 2002 in memory of the late Mr. S.D. Somasundaram B.E., former Revenue Minister of the Government of Tamil Nadu and Member of Parliament, who devoted his life to helping the needy. During his tenure as minister of Tamil Nadu, he brought about many reforms in the government machinery for the betterment of the community. The trust focuses on the socioeconomic and educational development of backward districts and villages, with a focus on child development, youth development, women's empowerment, and care and support for elderly people. Since its inception, the trust has been actively working to create a healthy society. So far, the trust has contributed to the Prime Minister's and Chief Minister's relief funds during natural disasters as needed, provided support for students' education, conducted free coaching classes to help students excel in scholarship exams, offered free computer and English skill development courses during summer and winter vacations, and provided monetary support to top performers. The "S.D.S. Award" is given to college students who excel in both academics and sports, and the "Best Teacher Award" is given to college teachers who shape and guide the future of India.
