= P. Balasubramanian =

Indian politician

P. Balasubramanian was the Member of the Tamil Nadu Legislative Assembly for the Pattukkottai constituency from 1996 to 2001. He was a candidate for the Dravida Munnetra Kazhagam.
