= Moothakurichi =

- village
- Location in Tamil Nadu, India Moothakurichi (India)
- Coordinates: 10°25′19″N 79°22′2″E
- Country: India
- State: Tamil Nadu
- District: Thanjavur
- Taluk: Pattukkottai

Area
  - Total: 7.18 km^{2} (2.77 sq mi)
  - Rank: 5

Population (2001)
  - Total: 2,865
  - Density: 399/km^{2} (1,030/sq mi)

Languages
  - Official: Tamil
- Time zone: UTC+5:30 (IST)
- Postal code: 614906
- Vehicle registration: Tn49
- Legislature type: Unicameral
- Legislature Strength: 1
- Website: www.moothakurichi.com

Moothakurichi is a village located in Madukkur Town Panchayat, Pattukkottai taluk, Thanjavur District, Tamil Nadu State, India. It is one of the villages in Musugundhanadu. It is the fifth largest village by area in Pattukkottai taluk. Total geographical area of the village is 718.67 hectares.

== Demographics ==
As per the 2001 census, Moothakurichi had a total population of 2865 with 1317 males and 1548 females. The sex ratio was 1175. The literacy rate was 73.57.
