= Olayakunnam =

- village
- Interactive map of Olayakunnam
- Coordinates: 10°30′46″N 79°24′27″E
- Country: India
- State: Tamil Nadu
- District: Thanjavur
- Taluk: Pattukkottai

Population (2001)
  - Total: 1,471

Languages
  - Official: Tamil
- Time zone: UTC+5:30 (IST)

Olayakunnam is a village in the Pattukkottai taluk of Thanjavur district, Tamil Nadu, India.

== Demographics ==
As per the 2001 census, Olayakunnam had a total population of 1417 with 736 males and 735 females. The sex ratio was 999. The literacy rate was 58.45.
