= Palaverikadu =

Coordinates: 10°24′N 79°26′E

- village
- Interactive map of Palaverikadu
- Country: India
- State: Tamil Nadu
- District: Thanjavur
- Taluk: Pattukkottai

Population (2001)
  - Total: 1,553

Languages
  - Official: Tamil
- Time zone: UTC+5:30 (IST)

Palaverikadu is a village in the Pattukkottai taluk of Thanjavur district, Tamil Nadu, India. It is surrounded by other villages, including Athivetti, Kalyanaoodai, Krishnapuram, Parakalakottai and Odhiyadikadu.

Most of the local population are farmers, who raise crops such as paddy, coconut, maize, blackgram, gingelly and sugarcane. It is irrigated by the Paatuvanachi river and a small canal from kallanai.

Pattukottai, Madhukkur, Muthupet and Adhirampattinam are the nearest towns.

== Demographics ==
As of the 2001 census, Palaverikadu had a total population of 1,553 with 777 males and 776 females. The literacy rate was 80%.
