= K. Annadurai =

Indian politician

Member of the Tamil Nadu Legislative Assembly
- Incumbent
- Assumed office 12 May 2021
- Preceded by: C.V.Sekar
- Constituency: Pattukkottai

Personal details
- Party: Dravida Munnetra Kazhagam

K. Annadurai is an Indian politician who is a Member of Legislative Assembly of Tamil Nadu.He was born in Mannangadu and belongs to Veerakodi Vellalar community. He was elected from Pattukkottai as a Dravida Munnetra Kazhagam candidate in 1989,1991,2021,2026.

== Electoral performance ==
2021 Tamil Nadu Legislative Assembly election: Pattukkottai
Party	Candidate	Votes	%	±%
DMK	K. Annadurai	79,065	44.9	New
AIADMK	N. R. Rengarajan	53,796	30.5	
Independent	V. Balakrishnan	23,771	13.5	New
NTK	Keerthika Anbu	10,730	6.1	
AMMK	S. D. S. Selvam	5,223	3	New
MNM	B. Sadasivam	3,088	1.8	New
NOTA	NOTA	1,026	0.42%	
Margin of victory		25,269	10.28%	2.83%
Turnout		176,174	75.8	
Rejected ballots		350	0.14%	
Registered electors		233,674		
DMK gain from AIADMK		Swing	-10.41%	

1991 Tamil Nadu Legislative Assembly election: Pattukkottai
Party	Candidate	Votes	%	±%
AIADMK	K. Balasubramaniam	67,764	62.07%	+38.42
DMK	K. Annadurai	39,028	35.75%	−1.44
PMK	C. Rengasamy	857	0.79%	New
JP	Saminathan Chinna	673	0.62%	New
Margin of victory		28,736	26.32%	13.08%
Turnout		109,169	67.58%	−9.96%
Registered electors		166,059		
AIADMK gain from DMK		Swing	24.88%	

1989 Tamil Nadu Legislative Assembly election: Varahur
Party	Candidate	Votes	%	±%
DMK	K. Annadurai	36,219	43.05%	0.60%
AIADMK	E. T. Ponnuvelu	28,895	34.35%	−22.57%
AIADMK	A. Arunachalam	8,507	10.11%	−46.81%
INC	A. Seppan	8,450	10.04%	
Independent	M. Thangavelu	985	1.17%	
Independent	M. Palanimuthu	424	0.50%	
Independent	P. Panneerselvam	362	0.43%	
Independent	P. Thangavelu	284	0.34%	
Margin of victory		7,324	8.71%	−5.76%
Turnout		84,126	62.44%	−11.18%
Registered electors		137,998		
DMK gain from AIADMK		Swing	-13.87%	
