= Regunathapuram, Pattukkottai =

Regunathapuram
- village
- Location in Tamil Nadu, India Regunathapuram (India)
- Coordinates: 10°26′2″N 79°23′14″E
- Country: India
- State: Tamil Nadu
- District: Thanjavur
- Taluk: Pattukkottai

Languages
  - Official: Tamil
- Time zone: UTC+5:30 (IST)

Regunathapuram is a village in the Pattukkottai taluk of Thanjavur district, Tamil Nadu, India.

== Demographics ==
The population in 2011 was 287.
