= Siramelkudi =

- village
- Nickname: Siravai
- Country: India
- State: Tamil Nadu
- District: Thanjavur
- Taluk: Pattukkottai

Population (2001)
  - Total: 871

Languages
  - Official: Tamil
- Time zone: UTC+5:30 (IST)
- Postal code: 614903

Siramelkudi is a village in the Pattukkottai taluk of Thanjavur district, Tamil Nadu, India. At the 2001 census, its population was 871 with 437 males and 434 females. The sex ratio was 933, and the literacy rate was 61.4%.
