= Alanpallam =

Alampallam
- village
- Interactive map of Alampallam
- Coordinates: 10.486815°N 79.3633998°E
- Country: India
- State: Tamil Nadu
- District: Thanjavur

Population (2001)
  - Total: 1,184

Languages
  - Official: Tamil
- Time zone: UTC+5:30 (IST)

Alampallam is a village in the Pattukkottai taluk of Thanjavur district, Tamil Nadu, India.

== Demographics ==
As per the 2001 census, Alampallam had a total population of 1184 with 537 males and 647 females. The sex ratio was 1205. The literacy rate was 67.77.
