= Karappankadu =

Coordinates: 10°27′N 79°27′E

- village
- Interactive map of Karappankadu
- Country: India
- State: Tamil Nadu
- District: Thanjavur

Population (2001)
  - Total: 589

Languages
  - Official: Tamil
- Time zone: UTC+5:30 (IST)

Karappankadu is a village in the Pattukkottai taluk of Thanjavur district, Tamil Nadu, India. The village is most famous for its Abeeshta Varadhan kovil (temple).

== Demographics ==
As per the 2001 census, Karappankadu had a total population of 589 with 264 males and 325 females. The sex ratio was 1231. The literacy rate was 73.85.
