= Periyakkottai =

PeriyakkottaI
- village
- Country: India
- State: Tamil Nadu
- District: Thanjavur
- Taluk: Pattukkottai

Government
  - President: Mr.Balamurugan

Population (2001)
  - Total: 2,878

Languages
  - Official: Tamil
- Time zone: UTC+5:30U (IST)

Periyakkottai is a village in the Pattukkottai taluk of Thanjavur district, Tamil Nadu, India.

== Demographics ==
As per the 2001 census, Periyakkottai had a total population of 2878 with 1383 males and 1495 females. The sex ratio was 1081. The literacy rate was 71.51.

A number of temples are situated around the village. These include Karpaga Vinayakar and Kamatchi Amman temple which situated in North Street in Periyakkottai. Mariamman Temple and Shivan Temple is in middle street. Agni veeranar temple is in Gopalasamudram.

There are 2 buses to periyakkottai from Pattukkotai; the 20A (a government bus) and 6 (Laxmi, a private bus).

There are 5 bus stops in Periyakkotai.

As there is only 2 buses to connect nearer town, there will be so much crowd in the bus during peak hours.

Periyakkottai located 5 km Away from Madukkur. Madukkur is one of the nearest town to periyakkotai.

This village surroundings with many rivers and lake. People living here mostly depends on agriculture.

Postal code no is 614903.
