= Kadathankudi =

Kadanthankudi
- Village
- Nickname: KKD
- Country: India
- State: Tamil Nadu
- District: Thanjavur

Population (2001)
  - Total: 1,527

Panchayat
  - Official: Tamil
- Time zone: UTC+5:30 (IST)
- Postal code: 614903

Kadanthankudi is a village in the Pattukkottai taluk of Thanjavur district, Tamil Nadu, India.

== Demographics ==
As per the 2001 census, Kadathankudi had a total population of 1527 with 795 males and 732 females. The sex ratio was 921. The literacy rate was 73.37.
