= Adirampattinam =

- Town
- Location in Tamil Nadu, India
- Coordinates: 10°21′N 79°24′E
- Country: India
- State: Tamil Nadu
- District: Thanjavur
- Taluk: Pattukkottai
- Zone: Cauvery Delta

Government
  - Type: Municipality
  - Body: Adirampattinam Municipality
  - Commissioner: M.Sasikumar

Area
  - Total: 12.8 km^{2} (4.9 sq mi)

Population (2021)
  - Total: 41,202 (By SIS)
  - Density: 3,220/km^{2} (8,340/sq mi)

Languages
  - Official: Tamil
- Time zone: UTC+5:30 (IST)
- PIN: 614701
- Telephone code: 04373
- Vehicle registration: TN 49
- Literacy: 88.63%
- House of the people - Parliament constituency: Thanjavur
- State Assembly constituency: Pattukkottai
- Avg. annual rainfall: 1,147 millimetres (45.2 in)

Adirampattinam is a town in the Pattukottai taluk of the Thanjavur district in the Indian state of Tamil Nadu. It is also known as Adirai in short by the residents. It is the largest coastal town in the district and fourth largest town in the Thanjavur district.

Adirampattinam is an important coastal town connecting Chennai and Thoothukudi via the ECR.

== History ==
Adirampattinam is named , who was a local chieftain. Arab traders from Egypt and Yemen landed at the port of Korkai (now Kayalpatnam) in the Pandia Kingdom in the year 1120 A.D. Some traders migrated here. Adirampattinam was initially called as Sellinagar. Strong trading connections existed with Yaalpanam, a city in Sri Lanka. There is a strong cultural connection between Kayalpatnam, Adirampattinam and Kilakarai.

In 2021, the government upgraded Adirampattinam to municipality status.

== Geography ==
=== Climate ===
Adirampattinam is located at 10.20°N 79.24°E on the coast of the Bay of Bengal. Being close to the equator, Adirampattinam enjoys a tropical wet and dry climate. Extreme heat prevails in the months of April and May, while mid-May is the hottest (Agni) period during a year – with temperatures regularly reaching 100 °F or 37.8 °C. December and January are winter months, with temperatures dropping to 17 °C or 62.6 °F. The northeast monsoon occurs in October and November. Adirampattinam normally receives rainfall of 1,200 millimetres or 47 inches per annum, with over half from October to December.

Köppen-Geiger climate classification system classifies its climate as tropical savanna (As).

Climate data for Adirampattinam (1991–2020, extremes 1962–present)
Month	Jan	Feb	Mar	Apr	May	Jun	Jul	Aug	Sep	Oct	Nov	Dec	Year
Record high °C (°F)	34.6 (94.3)	35.2 (95.4)	37.0 (98.6)	43.0 (109.4)	42.0 (107.6)	41.6 (106.9)	42.0 (107.6)	39.5 (103.1)	38.9 (102.0)	39.0 (102.2)	35.0 (95.0)	34.0 (93.2)	43.0 (109.4)
Mean daily maximum °C (°F)	30.5 (86.9)	32.0 (89.6)	33.3 (91.9)	34.3 (93.7)	34.4 (93.9)	34.6 (94.3)	34.6 (94.3)	34.2 (93.6)	33.7 (92.7)	32.3 (90.1)	30.4 (86.7)	29.7 (85.5)	32.8 (91.0)
Mean daily minimum °C (°F)	20.7 (69.3)	21.4 (70.5)	23.5 (74.3)	26.5 (79.7)	27.0 (80.6)	26.4 (79.5)	25.8 (78.4)	25.4 (77.7)	25.3 (77.5)	24.6 (76.3)	23.2 (73.8)	21.7 (71.1)	24.3 (75.7)
Record low °C (°F)	15.8 (60.4)	15.6 (60.1)	16.2 (61.2)	20.4 (68.7)	18.5 (65.3)	19.2 (66.6)	20.9 (69.6)	21.0 (69.8)	21.0 (69.8)	19.0 (66.2)	18.2 (64.8)	16.2 (61.2)	15.6 (60.1)
Average precipitation mm (inches)	24.5 (0.96)	18.5 (0.73)	18.2 (0.72)	46.5 (1.83)	74.0 (2.91)	33.2 (1.31)	52.4 (2.06)	89.4 (3.52)	108.2 (4.26)	211.6 (8.33)	294.0 (11.57)	160.7 (6.33)	1,131.2 (44.54)
Average rainy days	1.6	0.9	1.0	2.5	3.1	2.6	3.5	4.6	5.0	9.9	12.1	6.2	53.0
Average relative humidity (%) (at 17:30 IST)	68	62	64	68	75	75	74	74	76	78	81	78	73
Source: India Meteorological Department

== Demographics ==
=== Population ===
As of the 2001 population census of India, Adiramapttinam has a population of 48,066 Males constitute 47.95%(14897) of the population and females 52.04%(16169). Adirampattinam has an average literacy rate of 74.21%. Children under 6 years of age make up 13.08% of the population. Islam is the major religion with 72.25% of the population being Muslim and more than 40 masjids within the town. Tamil is the official language and is predominantly spoken. The most commonly used dialect is the Central Tamil dialect. Adiramapttinam is also the fourth largest town by population in the Thanjavur district.

== Transport ==
This town is connected via road and rail with major towns and cities in Tamil Nadu.

=== By Rail ===
Adiramapattinam Railway Station is also one of the major railway stations in Tiruchirapalli Zone. Karaikudi to Tiruvarur passenger train is operating via Adiramapattinam Railway Station.

=== By Road ===
The major port near by Adirai is Thoothukudi. Adirampattinam is a coastal town connecting Chennai and Thoothukudi via the ECR. It is the gateway town for the Chola Nadu region in Tamil Nadu. It is situated at a distance of 59 km from the district capital, Thanjavur, and 356 km south of the state capital, Chennai. The ECR links road SH-66 from Kumbakonam, which meets the ECR at this town.

The East Coast Road (ECR) from Chennai to Kanyakumari connects this town as well. The major inter city bus routes from this town are to Pattukkottai, Muthupet, Thanjavur, Mannargudi, Nagapattinam, Vedaranyam, Kumbakonam, Peravurani and Pudukkottai. Long-distance buses are also operating from Adirampattinam to Chennai, Tiruchirapalli, Puducherry, Karaikal, Rameshwaram, Thiruchendur, Nagercoil, Thiruvananthapuram etc.

Omni buses are also operating from this town to Chennai, Bangalore, Coimbatore, Tiruchirapalli, Puducherry, Cuddalore, Chidambaram, Kayalpattinam, Tirunelveli, Nagercoil etc.

== Adjacent communities ==
It is the municipality in Tamil Nadu, fourth largest town in Thanjavur District and ninth largest town in Delta region of Tamil Nadu after Thanjavur, Kumbakonam, Nagapattinam, Mannargudi, Mayiladuthurai, Tiruvarur, Pattukkottai and Sirkazhi.
