= Kalyanaodai =

- village
- Country: India
- State: Tamil Nadu
- District: Thanjavur

Population (2001)
  - Total: 500

Languages
  - Official: Tamil
- Time zone: UTC+5:30 (IST)

Kalyanaodai is a village in the Pattukkottai taluk of Thanjavur district, Tamil Nadu, India.

== Demographics ==
As per the 2001 census, Kalyanaodai had a total population of 500 with 228 males and 272 females. The sex ratio was 1.193. The literacy rate was 81.8. The village fully with a major caste Kallar. This village has one government school from class first to fifth standard. People here are very spiritually oriented, there are few temples for god Vinayaga, Shiva and goddess named Maariyamman and Om Shakthi Devi and also a famous temple in this village is Swami Aathiyappan Temple, it is also called as (kaaval deivam) in Tamil meaning "god of soldier", for this village and its people.

The village also has one veterinary hospital.
