= Vikkiramam =

- village
- Location in Tamil Nadu, India Vikkiramam (India)
- Coordinates: 10°27′50″N 79°24′9″E
- Country: India
- State: Tamil Nadu
- District: Thanjavur
- Taluk: Pattukkottai

Government
  - Panchayat President: MAHESHWARI ASOHAN

Population (2001)
  - Total: 3,824

Languages
  - Official: Tamil
- Time zone: UTC+5:30 (IST)
- PIN: 614903
- Telephone code: 04373
- Vehicle registration: TN 49

Vikkiramam is a village in the Pattukkottai taluk of Thanjavur district, Tamil Nadu, India.

== Demographics ==
As per the 2001 census, Vikkiramam had a total population of 3824 with 1854 males and 1970 females. The sex ratio was 1063. The literacy rate was 69.11, with a large number of people residing at the state capital-Chennai, Singapore, Malaysia, U.A.E or U.S.
