= Athivetti =

- village
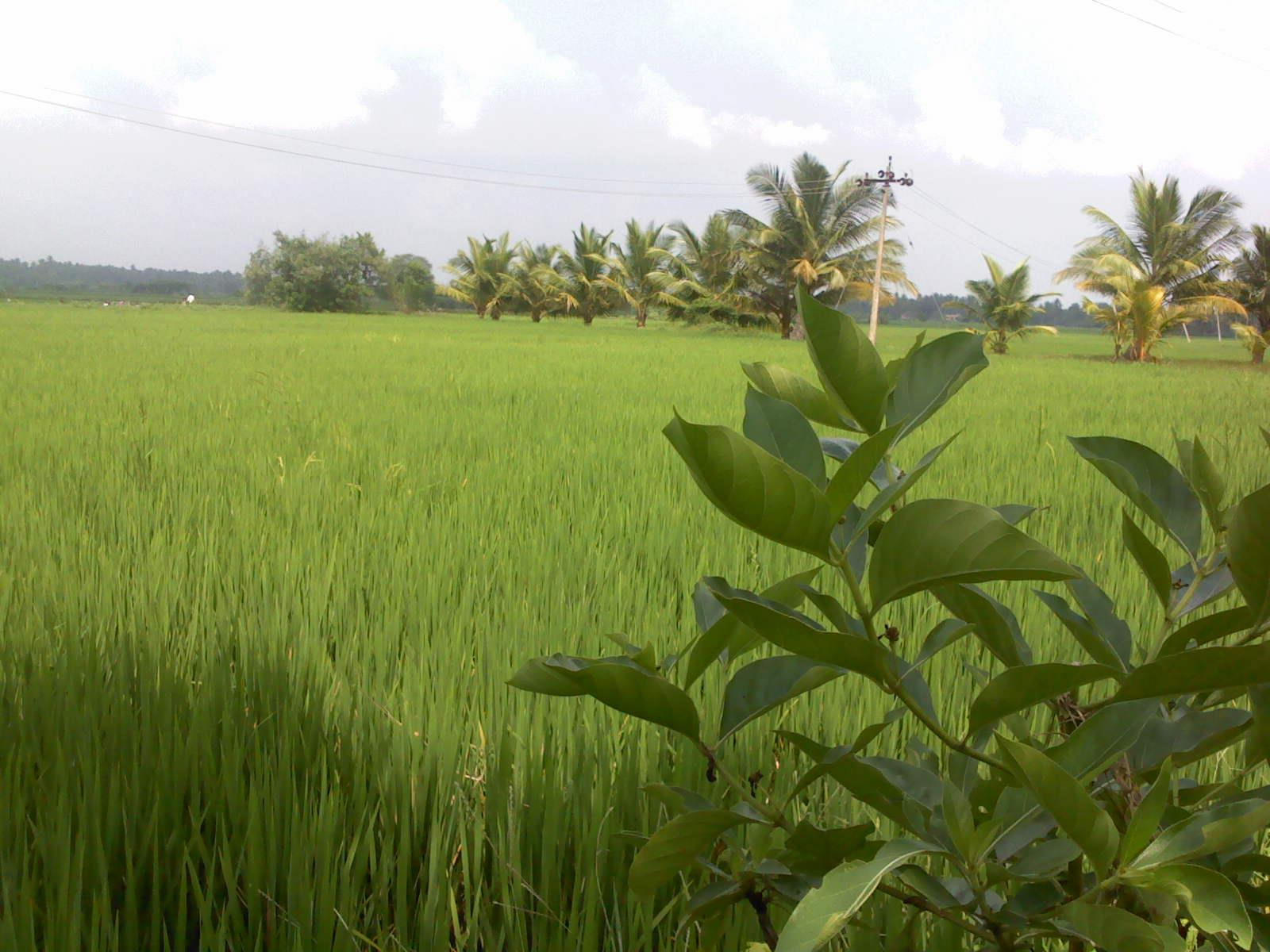

- Location in Tamil Nadu, India Athivetti (India)
- Coordinates: 10°25′10.956″N 79°24′45.6474″E
- Country: India
- State: Tamil Nadu
- District: Thanjavur
- Taluk: Pattukkottai

Government
  - Body: Panchayat

Population (Census 2011)
  - Total: 4,622

Languages
  - Official: Tamil
- Time zone: UTC+5:30 (IST)
- PIN: 614613

Athivetti is a village located near Madukkur Block, Pattukkottai taluk, Thanjavur District, Tamil Nadu State, India.

During the formation of Indian National Army, many men in Singapore from Athivetti joined INA.

== Sub villages ==
Athivetti is composed of the following villages

- Pichinikkadu
- Gandhi Nagar
- Anna Nagar
- Vadakikadu (North Street)
- Therkikadu (South Street)
- Mathankadu
- Vandayankadu
- Kovillkadu
- Maravakkadu

== Economy ==
Agriculture is basic occupation of this village. Paddy is their first choice of cultivation. Sugar cane is also cultivated there. Poultry is also available there. Most of the men are in foreign countries. Some people from here joined SRM for college studies.
