= Kasangadu =

- Panchayat
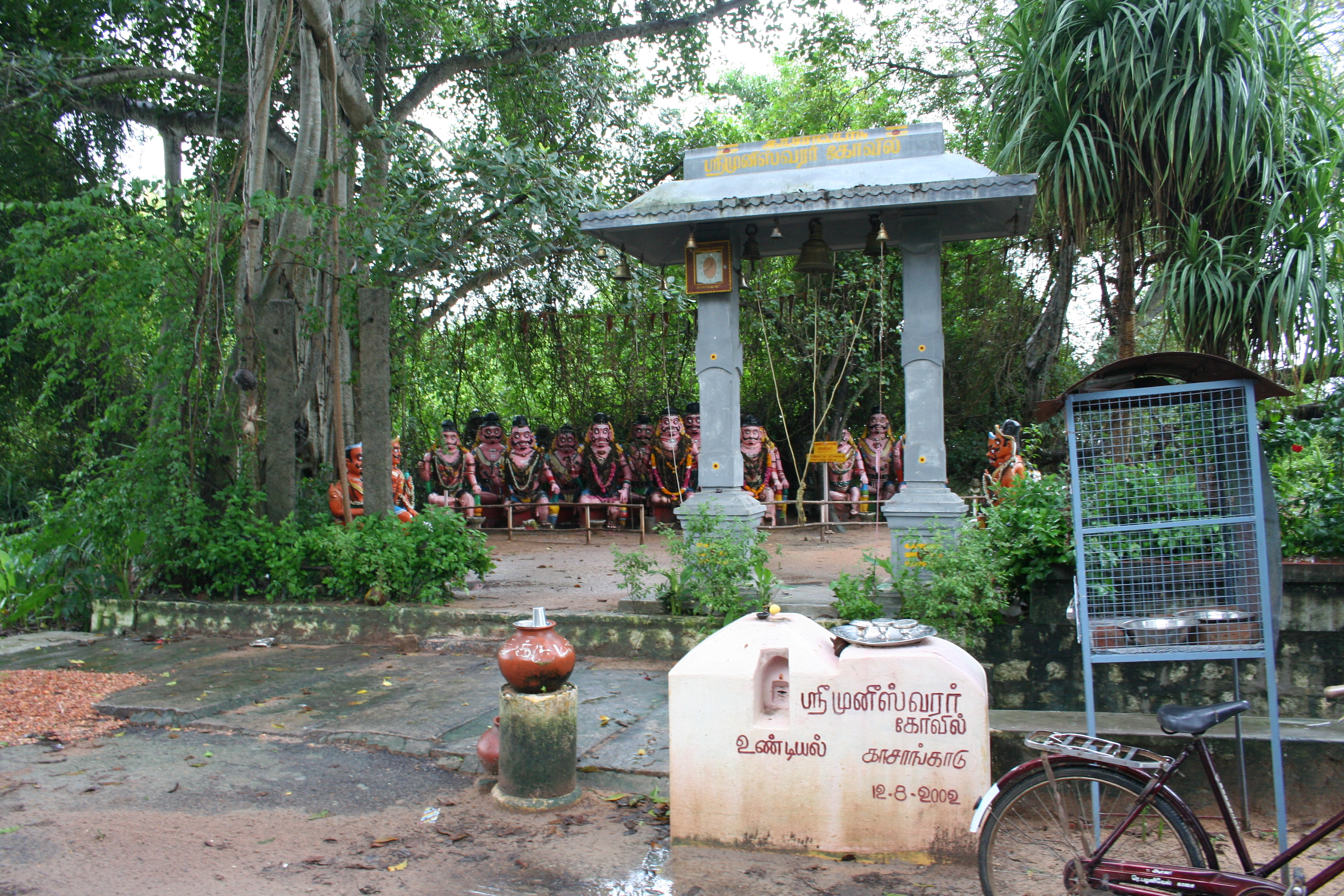
- Kasangadu Muniveeswarar Kovil

- Location in Tamil Nadu, India Kasangadu (India)
- Coordinates: 10°25′19″N 79°22′2″E
- Country: India
- State: Tamil Nadu
- Established: 1750_1800

Government
  - Type: Panchayati raj (India)
  - Body: Gram panchayat

Population
  - Total: 2,958

Languages
  - Official: Tamil
- Time zone: UTC+5:30 (IST)
- Postal code: 614613
- Vehicle registration: TN49
- Legislature type: Unicameral
- Legislature Strength: 1
- Website: www.kasangadu.com

Kasangadu is a village located in Madukkur Panchayat Union, Pattukkottai taluk, Thanjavur District, Tamil Nadu State, India. It is one of the 32 villages forming the Musgundhanadu, a Velalar Community. It is surrounded by Moothakuruchi to north, Vattakudi and Regunathapuram to east, Mannangadu to south, Vendakottai to south west, Nattuchalai to west. The total geographical area of the village is 242.34 hectares.

Many people from this village have settled in foreign countries like Singapore, United Arab Emirates, Malaysia, United Kingdom, France, Australia, United States of America, Poland.

== History ==
Kasangadu village is a fitting example of a modern village in India. Right from administration until the contribution of every citizens is covered. More about Kasangadu's history may be obtained from (Tamil: Kasangadu History)

== Lake ==
Kasangadu Manjikineri

This supplies water for irrigation to part of the lands in Kasangadu. This is the biggest lake in this village. The origin of water for this lake is from Cauvery river from Kallannai. This third largest lake in pattukkottai area.

== Economy ==
Paddy cultivation in Kasangadu

Paddy Cultivation is the main source of income for all the villagers in Kasangadu.

== Muniswarar Temple ==
The deity Muniveeswarar is mainly prayed for border security to the farming lands/village to prevent any theft/disasters to the cultivation/Village.
