= Karuppur, Pattukkottai taluk =

Karuppur
- village
- Nickname: Black City
- Country: India
- State: Tamil Nadu
- District: Thanjavur

Population (2001)
  - Total: 1,454
  - Density: 4.6/km^{2} (12/sq mi)

Languages
  - Official: Tamil
- Time zone: UTC+5:30 (IST)

Karuppur is a village in the Pattukottai Talk, pincode:614903 of Thanjavur district, Tamil Nadu, India.

== Demographics ==
As per the 2001 census, Karuppur had a total population of 1454 with 727 males and 727 females. The sex ratio was 1000. The literacy rate was 75.93
