= Vattakudi =

Vattakudi Vattakudi
- village
- Interactive map of Vattakudi
- Coordinates: 10°25′09″N 79°23′05″E
- Country: India
- State: Tamil Nadu
- District: Thanjavur
- Taluk: Pattukkottai

Government
  - Panchayat President: rajasekar

Population (2001)
  - Total: 1,317

Languages
  - Official: Tamil
- Time zone: UTC+5:30 (IST)
- PIN: 614613
- Website: www.vattakudi.com

Vattakudi is a village in the Pattukkottai taluk of Thanjavur district, Tamil Nadu, India.

== Demographics ==
As per the 2020 census, Vattakudi north had a total population of 2716 with 1703 males and 1013 females. The sex ratio was 1222. The literacy rate was 71.67%.

== About Vattakudi north ==
Vattakudi north is located near Pattukkottai, Thanjavur district. The people are generally well educated. Agriculture is the main occupation in this village

== Temples ==
The temples located here are SRI KALYANA SUBURAMANIYA SWAMI TEMPLE, Veeranar and naachiyathal temple, Minnadiyar temple, Sri Balathandayudhabani temple, Ganapathi temple etc.

== Famous persons ==
Music Director Thasi born at vattakudi. Iranniyan who struggled for independence of India in 1947, born at Vattakudi.

Famous Fellow Kaveendar Palanivel, ADMK Youth wing secretary born in 24-08-2001 at vattakudi.
