= Pattukkottai =

Pattukkottai பட்டுக்கோட்டை
- town
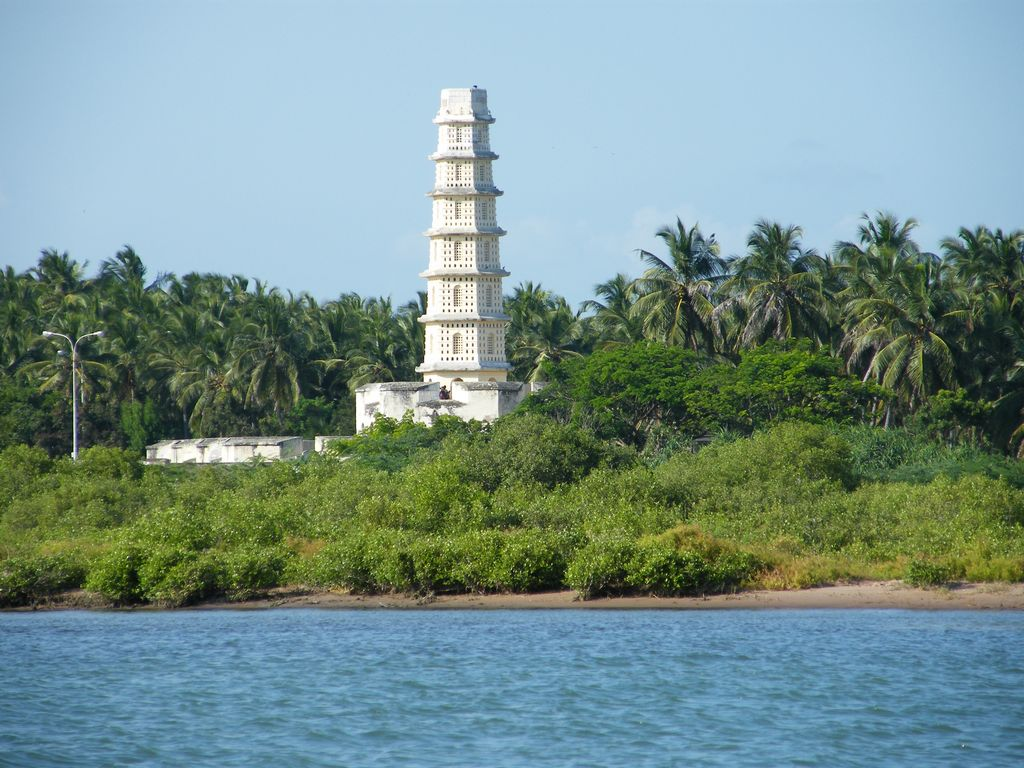
- Manora fort

- Location in Tamil Nadu, India
- Coordinates: 10.43°N 79.32°E
- Country: India
- State: Tamil Nadu
- District: Thanjavur
- Region: Chola Nadu
- Zone: Cauvery Delta
- Established: 1965
- Headquarters: Thanjavur

Government
  - Type: Selection Grade Municipality
  - Body: Pattukkottai Municipality
  - Municipal Chairperson: -

Area
  - Total: 24 km^{2} (9.3 sq mi)
- Elevation: 5 m (16 ft)

Population (2011)
  - Total: 73,135
  - Density: 3,000/km^{2} (7,900/sq mi)
- Time zone: UTC+5:30 (IST)
- PIN: 614601, 614602
- Telephone code: +91 4373
- Vehicle registration: TN 49
- Sex ratio: 1003 ♂/♀
- Website: 123.63.242.116/Pattukkottai/

Pattukkottai is a major town in Thanjavur district in the Indian state of Tamil Nadu and also important town in Delta districts and Commercial town of Thanjavur, Thiruvarur and Pudukkottai district Coastal areas. The town came to prominence throughout Southern India after the construction of the fort by Vanaji Pandithar, a feudatory of the Thanjavur Maratha ruler Shahuji I in 1686–87. The recorded history of Pattukkottai is known from the 17th century and has been ruled, at different times, by the Thanjavur Marathas and the British. It is the headquarters of the Pattukkottai taluk of Thanjavur district and is one of the two municipalities in the district.

Pattukkottai comes under the Pattukkottai assembly constituency which elects a member to the Tamil Nadu Legislative Assembly once every five years and it is a part of the Thanjavur (Lok Sabha constituency) which elects its Member of Parliament (MP) once in five years. The town is administered by the Pattukkottai municipality, which covers an area of 21.83 km^{2} (8.43 sq mi). As of 2011, the town had a population of 73,135. The town is a part of the fertile Cauvery delta region, but the fishery is the major occupation. Roadways and railways are the major mode of transportation to Pattukkottai and the nearest international airport is Tiruchirapalli Airport, located 100 km (62 mi) away from the town, in the city of Tiruchirappalli.

== History ==
According to an inscription, the fortress of Pattukkottai was constructed by Vanaji Pandithar, a feudatory of the Thanjavur Maratha ruler Shahuji I in 1686–87. Pattukkottai was ruled by the Thanjavur Marathas till 1799 when it was annexed by the British East India Company. It became a part of Tanjore district in 1801.

Having a population of 7,603 in 1901, Pattukkottai experienced a population splurge between 1941 and 1981, when its population quadrupled. Sri Nadiamman temple is the most important Hindu temple in Pattukkottai and is of considerable antiquity. In 2018, cyclone Kaja hit Pattukottai and majority of its farmland and vegetation were lost. It almost took more than year for normalcy to prevail.

R. Venkataraman, Pattukkottai Alagiri, Pattukkottai Kalyanasundaram, S. D. Somasundaram, V. Nadimuthu pillai, P Samuel Pillai and AR Marimuthu Pillai are some of the most famous people born in this soil

== Geography ==
Pattukkottai 10.43°N 79.32°E is located along the southeastern coast of India in the East-central region of Tamil Nadu, in the general Kaveri River delta area. Pattukkottai Municipality covers an area of 21.83 km^{2}., and has an average elevation of 5 meters (16 feet). Pattukkottai is 48 km from the city of Thanjavur. The coast of the Bay of Bengal is just 12 km away, with Manora fort 15 km away from this town.

Pattukkottai lies on an extremely dry, rugged plateau. The Pattukkottai division is the only division of Thanjavur district which is not watered either by the Kaveri River or any of its tributaries or distributaries. Pattukkottai comes under the "As" region of the Köppen climate classification, as it is situated in Tropical region and receive its maximum rainfall during the winter months from October, November and December. Due to its geographical position, Pattukkottai generally experiences hot and humid climates and there is little to no extreme variation in seasonal temperature. As it is nearer to the equator, the summer season starts from April and extends till early June. This period observes the hottest part of the year, locally known as "Agni Nakshatram" or "Khatri veyil".

== Demographics ==
Religious census
Religion	Percent(%)
Hindu	86.82%
Muslim	7.57%
Christian	5.34%
Sikh	0.02%
Buddhist	0.07%
Jain	0.06%
Other	0.1%
No religion	0.02%

Historical population
Year	Pop.	±%
1901	7,503	—
1911	8,515	+13.5%
1921	9,623	+13.0%
1931	10,981	+14.1%
1941	12,709	+15.7%
1951	18,246	+43.6%
1961	24,726	+35.5%
1971	37,682	+52.4%
1981	49,484	+31.3%
1991	57,909	+17.0%
2001	65,553	+13.2%
2011	73,097	+11.5%
Source: 1901 – 2011: "Population Growth of Pattukkottai". Department Of Municipal Administration And Water Supply. Pattukkottai Municipality. Archived from the original on 12 June 2010.; 2011:

According to 2011 census, Pattukkottai had a population of 73,135 with a sex-ratio of 1,010 females for every 1,000 males, which is much higher than the national average of 929. A total of 7,019 people in the town were under the age of six, constituting 3,630 males and 3,389 females. Scheduled Castes and Scheduled Tribes accounted for 5.86% and 0.8% of the population respectively. The average literacy rate of the town is 80.68%, which is higher compared to the national average of 72.99%. The town had a total of 18,437 households. There were a total of 25,908 workers: 623 cultivators, 2,044 main agricultural labourers, 697 in household industries, 19,653 other workers, 2,891 marginal workers, 118 marginal cultivators, 534 marginal agricultural labourers, 172 marginal workers in household industries and 2,067 other marginal workers.

As per the religious census of 2011, Pattukkottai had 86.82% Hindus, 7.57% Muslims, 5.34% Christians, 0.02% Sikhs, 0.07% Buddhists, 0.06% Jains, 0.1% following other religions and 0.02% following no religion or did not indicate any religious preference.

Tamil is the official language and is predominantly spoken. The most commonly used dialects is the Central Tamil dialect. English is widely understood in the town area. Both languages are widely used for various purposes such as commerce, in the town.

== Administration ==
Elected members
Member of Legislative Assembly	Thiru K.Annadurai
Member of Parliament	Thiru .S.Murasoli
Municipality Chairman and Vice chairman
Chairman	Tmt S.Shanmugapriya
vice chairman	Thiru P.Suresh
Municipality Commissioner
Commissioner	Thiru T.Soundararajan

The municipality of Pattukkottai was constituted on 1 April 1965 covering an area of 21.83 sq. kilometres. Pattukkottai was upgraded to a second-grade municipality on 1 April 1975 and a first-grade municipality on 7 April 1984. Presently, it is a selection-grade municipality and consists of 33 wards. The municipality is sub-divided into five revenue villages – Nadiyambal Puram, Kailasanathapuram, Maharajasamudram, Rengojiyappa Thottam and Pappaveli Palayamkottai.

Pattukkottai (state assembly constituency) has been a part of the Thanjavur parliamentary constituency from 2009. As per the latest draft electoral rolls released by the election commission, the Pattukottai assembly segment comprises 1,77,798 voters (85,476 male and 83,902 female). K. Annadurai from Dravida Munnetra Kazhagam was elected as the MLA in the 2021 Tamil Nadu Legislative Assembly election.

Pattukkottai is a part of the Thanjavur Lok Sabha constituency and elects a member to the Lok Sabha, the lower house of the Parliament of India, once every five years. In 2019 Indian general election S.S. Palanimanickam from Dravida Munnetra Kazhagam was elected as the MP.

== Economy ==
In British times, brass vessels, cotton cloths and mats were the main manufactures of Pattukkottai. In 1951, anthropologist Kathleen Gough notes that Pattukkottai had the largest portion of zamindari and inam lands in Thanjavur district.

Agriculture, using water from the Kaveri, though the town hosts a number of other businesses. Paddy and coconut are the major crops, however, a large variety of produce is grown in and around Pattukkottai. Pattukkottai was declared a "coir cluster" in September 2007 in order to promote traditional coir-based industries.

In Tamil Nadu, after Pollachi, coconut cultivation has been extensively done in Pattukkottai's surroundings on 30,000 hectares of land along the coast. Pattukottai has been declared a Coir Cluster under a Central scheme called "Scheme Fund for Regeneration of Traditional Industries" (SFURT). A coconut complex at Ponnvarayankottai near Pattukottai is to be constructed at a cost of Rs.4 Crores and will have sections for trading, grading coconuts and separating copra, drying yard, shops for traders, and for tourists, restrooms, information centre and parking lots. It would be expanded in future depending upon the needs of farmers. There are also demands to set up industries to promote Coir-related products with value addition.

== Utility services ==
Electricity supply to Pattukkottai is regulated and distributed by the Tamil Nadu Electricity Board (TNEB). The city along with its suburbs is a part of Trichy Electricity Distribution Circle. Water supply is handled by the municipality and the town gets an average of 7.65 million litres of water everyday from the Sathankadu head works pumped from 3 pumping stations. Pattukkottai has a total of 63 kilometres of metalled roads, 9.5 kilometres of cemented roads and 0.1 kilometre of unsurfaced roads. The municipality maintains 5 parks, 5 shopping complexes and a daily market.

Solid waste are collected from Pattukkottai every day by door-to-door collection and subsequently the source segregation and dumping is carried out by the sanitary department of the Pattukottai municipality. The coverage of solid waste management had an efficiency of 100% as of 2001. There is no underground drainage system in the town and the current sewerage system for disposal of sullage is through septic tanks, open drains and public conveniences.

There is one government hospital, 24 private hospitals and a lot of practising doctors in Pattukkottai who take care of the health care needs of the citizens. There are a total of 2,883 street lamps: 448 sodium lamps, 2,432 tube lights and three high mast beam lamps. The municipality operates one markets, namely the Alagiri Daily Market, while there is a private market by name V.N.S.Market. Pattukkottai comes under the Thanjavur Telecom circle of the Bharat Sanchar Nigam Limited (BSNL), India's state-owned telecom and internet services provider. Apart from telecom, BSNL also provides broadband internet service.

Pattukkottai has a total of 21 primary and secondary schools and a polytechnic college. There are two arts colleges and one government engineering college.

== Transport ==
Pattukkottai is connected by road and rail with the rest of Tamil Nadu.

=== By Rail ===
Pattukkottai comes under Tiruchirappalli Railway Division of the Southern Railway.

Pattukkottai railway station is situated on the main route of Chennai Egmore - Rameswaram line, which is located approximately 500 metres east from Bus station towards Adirampattinam. The gauge conversion work completed by last quarter of 2019, but still not much trains are operational thru this route due to operational difficulties.

=== By Road ===
There are regular buses to Chennai, Bangalore, Thanjavur, Tiruchirappalli, Kumbakonam, Muthupet, Thiruthuraipoondi, Velankanni, Nagapattinam, Vedaranyam, Mannargudi, Madurai, Coimbatore, Tiruppur, Kanyakumari, Tiruchendur, Karaikudi, Pudukkottai, Palani, Tirupati, Rameswaram, Ramanathapuram, Tirunelveli, Nagercoil, Marthandam, Thiruvananthapuram, Tenkasi, Kollam, Thoothukudi, Kovilpatti other towns and cities throughout Tamil Nadu. There are some newly created routes which heads to inter state cities also. Pattukkottai forms a part of the division number. 1 of the Tamil Nadu State Transport Corporation which is headquartered at Kumbakonam. The town has 2 bus depots for inter-city bus services.

== See also ==
- Vedaranyam
- Velankanni
