= Agniyar River =

River in Tamil Nadu

- Location in Tamil Nadu Agniyar River (India)

Location
- Country: India
- State: Tamil Nadu

Physical characteristics
- Source
  - location: South of Keeranur
  - coordinates: 10°33′11″N 78°48′35″E
- Mouth
  - location: South of Rajamadam
  - coordinates: 10°17′40″N 79°22′6″E
- Basin size: 2058 km^{2}
- Discharge
  - location: Palk Strait
  - average: 90.3 million meters^{3}/year

Basin features
- Progression: Southeast
- Landmarks: Pattukkottai
- Population: 823,000
- Tributaries
  - left: Grand Anicut canal, left Nariyar River, Maharajasamundram River
  - right: Right Nariyar River

The Agniyar River is a non-perennial river in the Indian state of Tamil Nadu that flows southeast into the Bay of Bengal.

== Course ==
The river begins as a small stream south of Keeranur, proceeding south and east, passing Karambakkudi. Southeast of Karambakkudi, the Grand Anicut canal connects to it. The river continues eastward past Sendakkottai, until it is joined by the Maharajasamundram River south of Pattukkottai and west of Adirampattinam. After this confluence, the river flows south for a short distance, until it empties into the Palk Strait south of the village of Rajamadam, in the Pattukkottai taluk of Thanjavur district.

=== Watershed ===
The Agniyar River is located with the greater Agniyar basin, which includes the Agniyar's drainage basin, along with the watersheds of the neighboring Ambuliyar and Vellar rivers. This basin is situated to the north of the Pambar basin, and to the south and east of the Kaveri basin. The greater Agniyar basin covers 4809 km^{2} of land in the Pudukkottai, Thanjavur, Tiruchirappalli, Sivaganga, and Dindigul districts, while the smaller Agniyar basin covers 2058 km^{2}. 1.9 million people live in the greater basin, while about 823,000 people make up the population of the smaller basin.

== Flow ==
As reported by a gauging station at the final dam across the river, the average yearly flow into the Bay of Bengal was about 90 million cubic metres of water. However, this average does not account for seasonal changes in precipitation and intermittent flow that result from India's wet and dry seasons.

=== Irrigation ===
The river is utilized for extensive irrigation projects, with eight anicuts damming the river and diverting its flow to 1,280 storage tanks and 24,073 hectares of surrounding farmland. Additionally, a pumping station draws water from the river for municipal supply.

== Environmental issues ==
The river suffers from high nitrate and fluoride concentrations that are the result of agricultural runoff. Poor solid waste management and soil erosion also harm the river. In the dry season, sand is sometimes illegally mined from the riverbed for use in construction. This extraction destabilizes the river's ecosystem and contributes to negative effects.
