= December 1910 =

Month of 1910

<<	December 1910					>>
Su	Mo	Tu	We	Th	Fr	Sa
				1	2	3
4	5	6	7	8	9	10
11	12	13	14	15	16	17
18	19	20	21	22	23	24
25	26	27	28	29	30	31

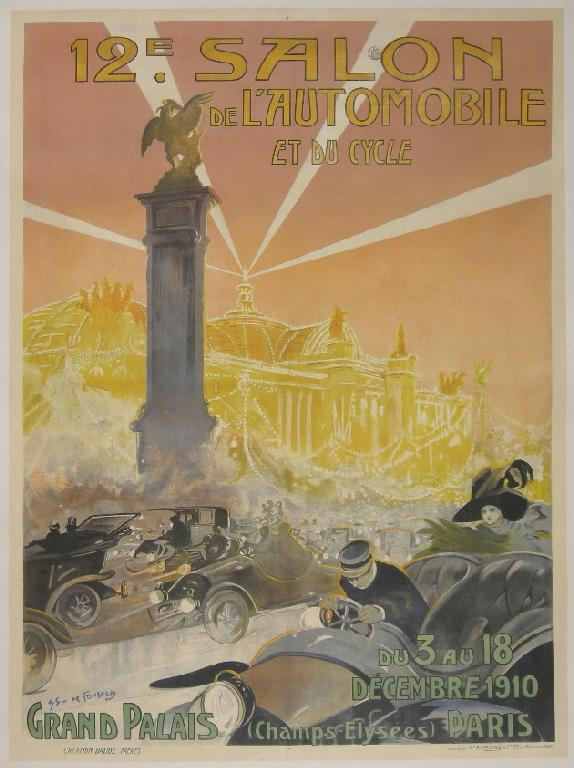
December 3, 1910: Neon lighting introduced at Paris Motor Show

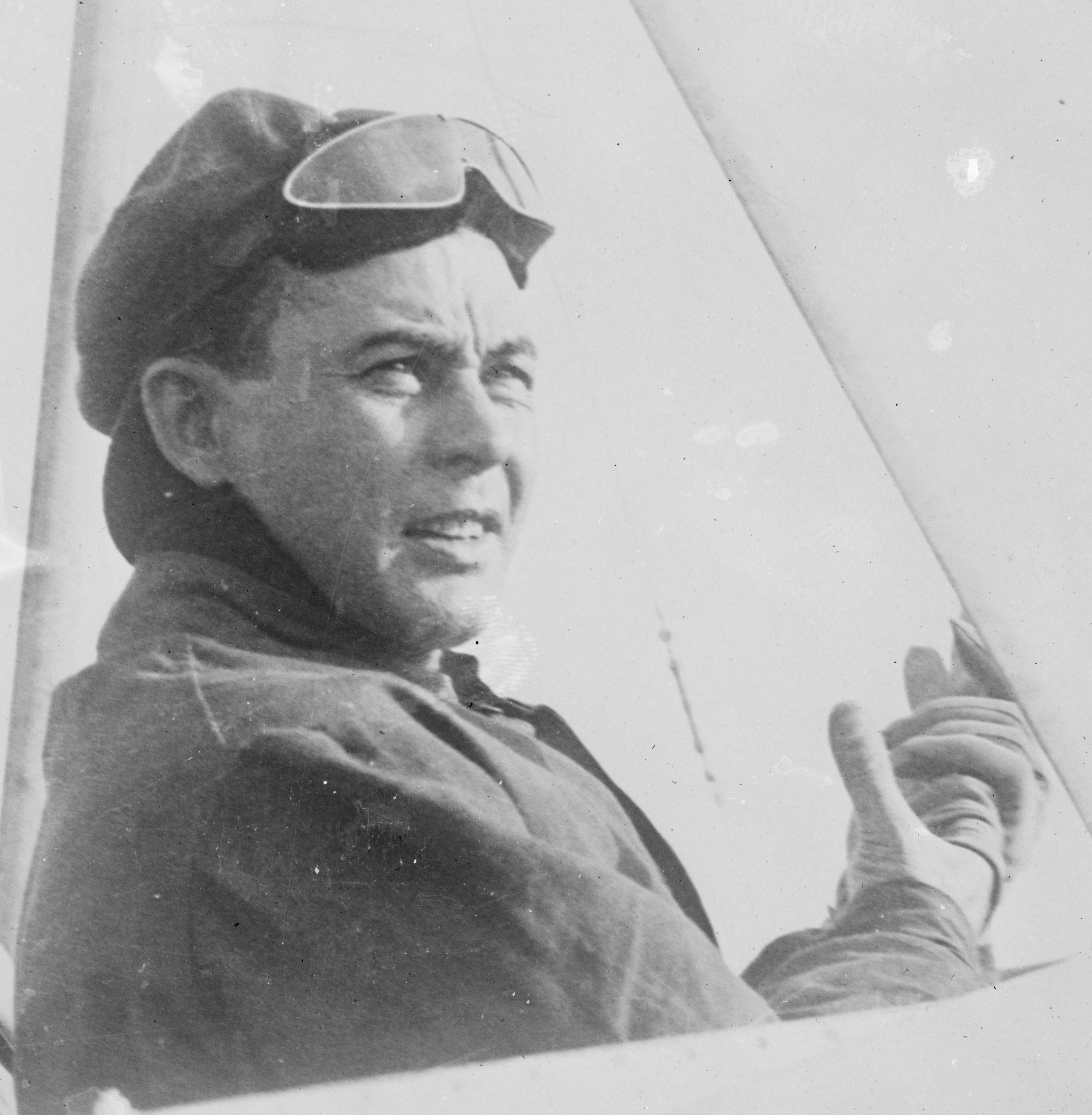
December 31, 1910: Aviator John B. Moisant killed in fall from airplane

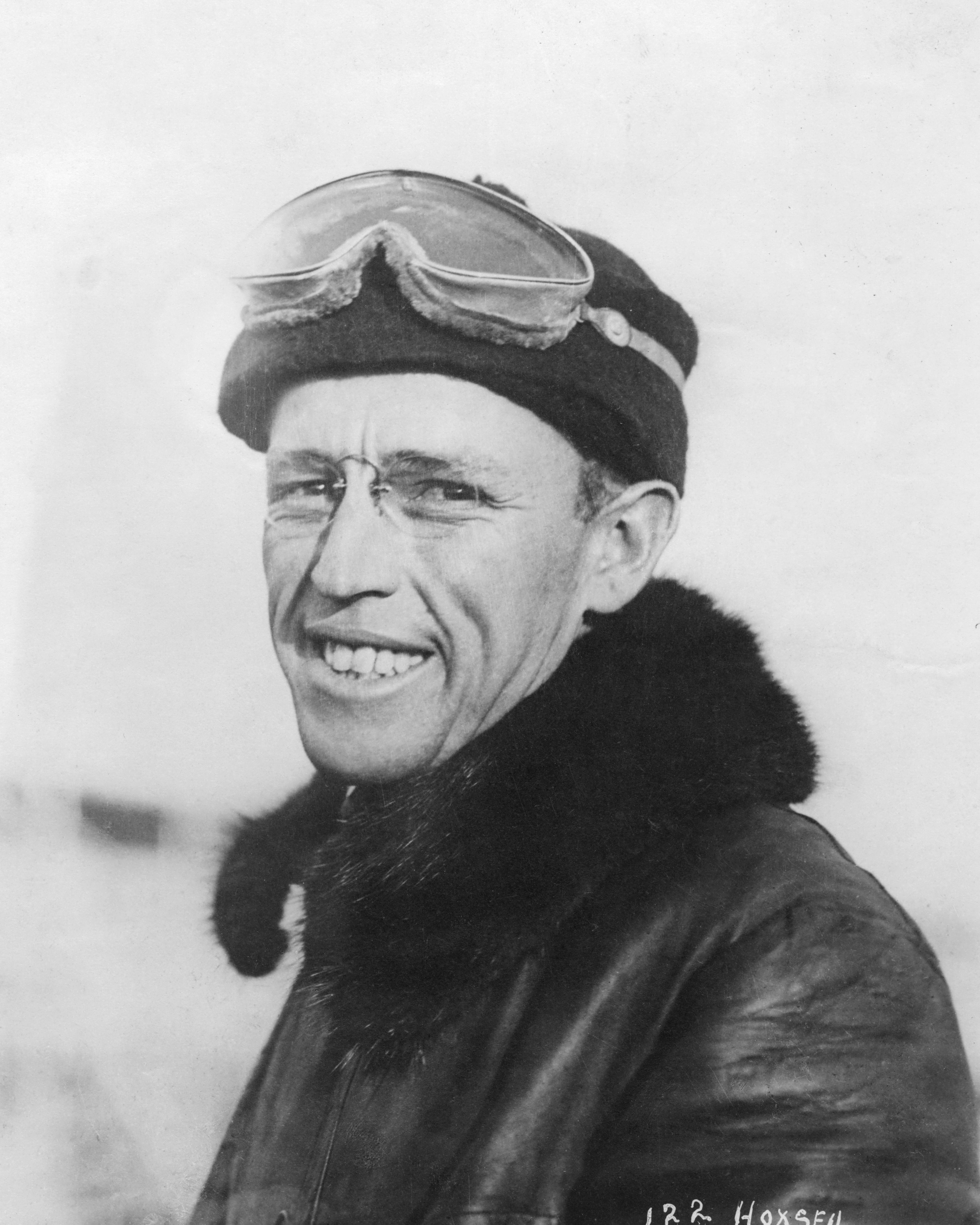
December 31, 1910: Aviator Archie Hoxsey killed in crash hours later, after saying, "From what I hear, Moisant was careless.."

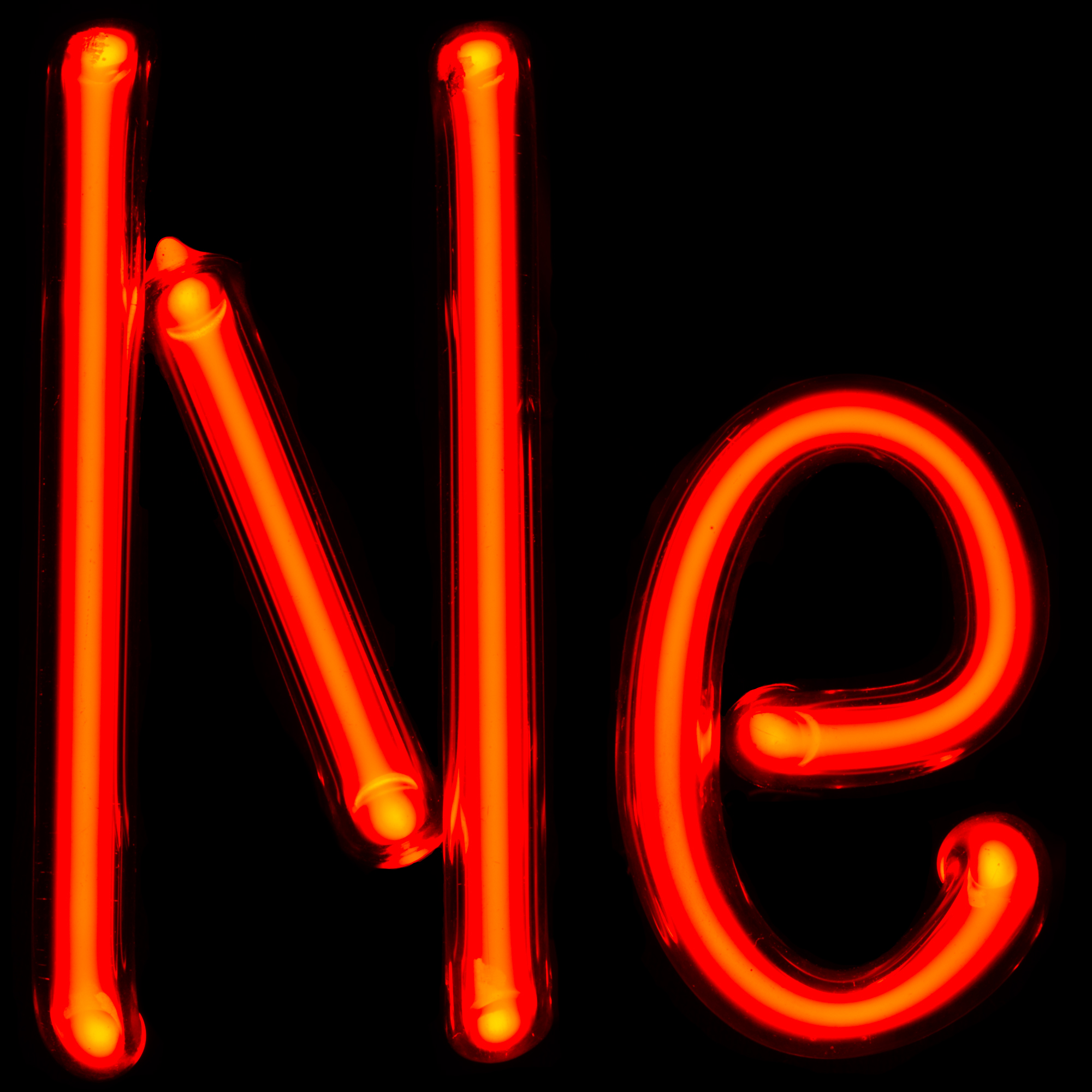
Neon (Ne) in neon lighting

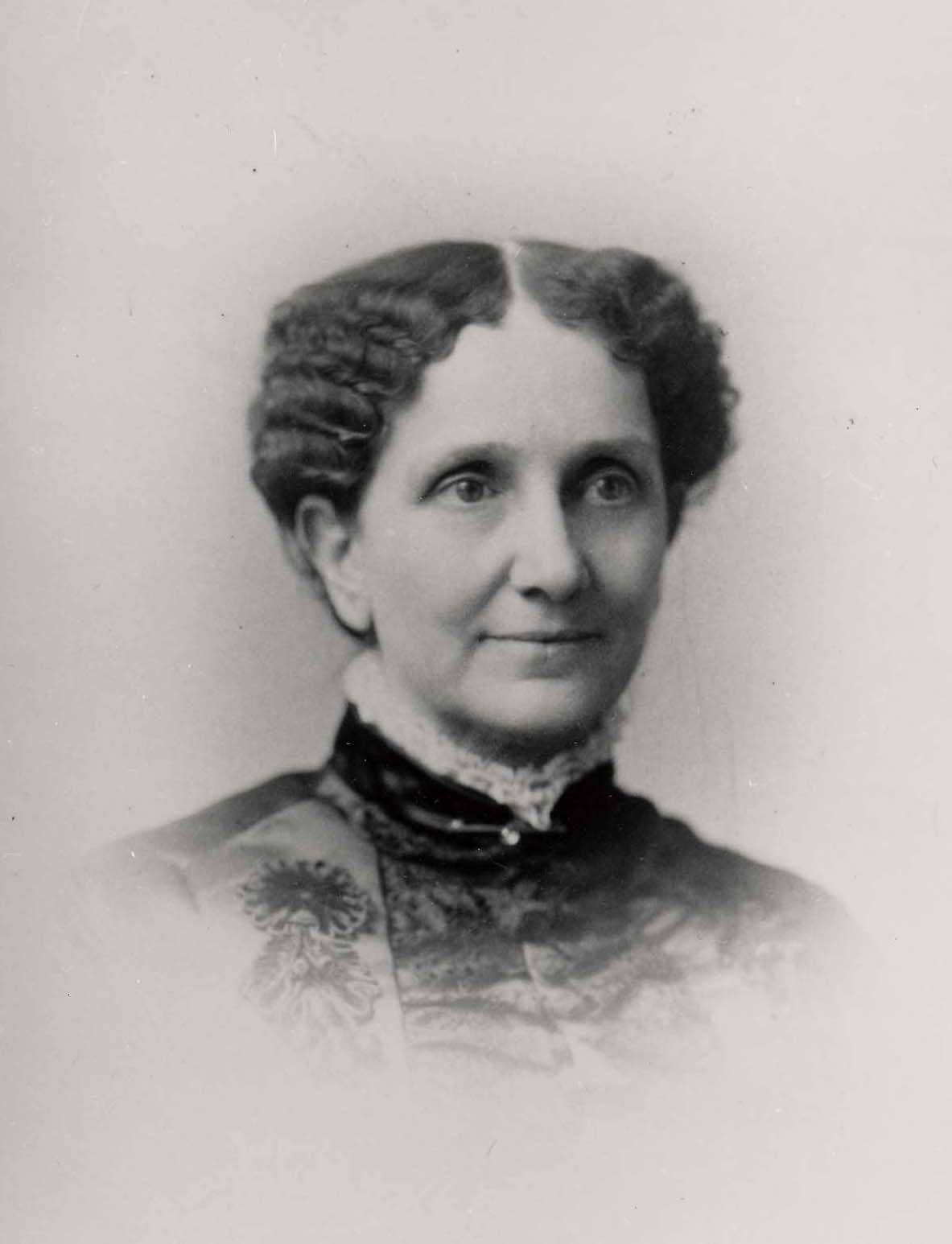
December 3, 1910: Christian Scientist Mary Baker Eddy dies at age 89

The following events occurred in December 1910:

== December 1, 1910 (Thursday) ==
- Porfirio Diaz was inaugurated for his eighth term as President of Mexico.
- Miss Helen Taft, the 19-year-old daughter of U.S. President William Howard Taft and his wife Nellie, had her debutante ball, with 1,500 guests coming to the White House, including Vice-President Sherman, 20 U.S. Senators and 19 U.S. Representatives.
- Born: Alicia Markova, English ballerina, as Lilian Marks; in London (d. 2004)

== December 2, 1910 (Friday) ==
- Three days into Robert Falcon Scott's expedition from New Zealand to the South Pole, his ship, the Terra Nova, was nearly sunk by a hurricane.
- At a meeting of the Council of Ministers in St. Petersburg, General Vladimir Sukhomlinov, the Minister of War, gave the Army's recommendation that northern Manchuria should immediately be annexed by Russia. Foreign Minister Sergei Sazonov and Finance Minister Vladimir Kokovtsov persuaded the council to delay on an action that would have led to war.
- Born: Russell Lynes, American art historian, photographer and author; in Great Barrington, Massachusetts (d. 1991)

== December 3, 1910 (Saturday) ==
- The first multiple fatality airplane accident in history happened at Centocelle, near Rome, when the airplane carrying Lt. Enrico Cammarota and Private S. Castellani crashed, making them the 26th and 27th people to die in a plane accident.
- Voting began in the December 1910 United Kingdom general election for the House of Commons, with 135 seats decided on the first day.
- The Paris Motor Show commenced, where modern neon lighting was first demonstrated publicly by French inventor Georges Claude. Claude's neon-filled glass tubes opened a new era in signage and led to fluorescent lighting.
- Australian mountaineer Freda Du Faur became the first woman to climb Aoraki / Mount Cook, the highest peak in New Zealand.
- Died:
  - Mary Baker Eddy, 89, American religious leader and founder of Christian Science.
  - John H. Barker, U.S. auto manufacturer and owner of Haskell-Barker Motor Company, was killed, along with his wife, in an accident in Michigan City, Indiana. The Barkers' 14-year-old daughter, Catherine, was the sole heir to an estate of 30 million dollars (equivalent to more than $800 million more than 110 years later) "making her one of the richest girls in the world".

== December 4, 1910 (Sunday) ==
- In the Mexican city of Chihuahua, Mexico, an attempt by a peace commission, to broker a truce between the Diaz government at the "Maderistas" who supported Francisco I. Madero
- Born: Ramaswamy Venkataraman, President of India, 1987 to 1992); in Rajamadam, Madras Province (now in Tamil Nadu state); (d. 2009)

== December 5, 1910 (Monday) ==
- By royal proclamation, the 2,349 km^{2} Australian Capital Territory was transferred from New South Wales to the Commonwealth of Australia, effective January 1.
- The Italian Nationalist Association, a right wing party which would, in 1921, merge with Benito Mussolini's National Fascist Party, was founded by Luigi Federzoni.
- The Government of Australia introduced a nationwide "Invalid Pension" plan (for invalids), now called the Disability Support Pension.
- Died: Jerome Coleman, American musical composer and former millionaire who reportedly lost $3,000,000 in later years, committed suicide by gas from an oven.

== December 6, 1910 (Tuesday) ==
- An antitrust suit was brought in Detroit against the manufacturers of bathtubs and plumbing supplies. George W. Wickersham, the U.S. Attorney General, obtained an indictment against 16 firms said to have control of 35% of enamel, ironware, tubs, sinks and lavatories in the United States.

== December 7, 1910 (Wednesday) ==
- Bolivian troops ambushed a garrison of Peruvian guards in a battle at the disputed border region at Guayabal.
- Born:
  - Louis Prima, American bandleader; in New Orleans (d. 1978)
  - Edmundo Ros, Trinidadian bandleader; in Port of Spain (d. 2011)
- Died: Ludwig Knaus, 81, German painter

== December 8, 1910 (Thursday) ==
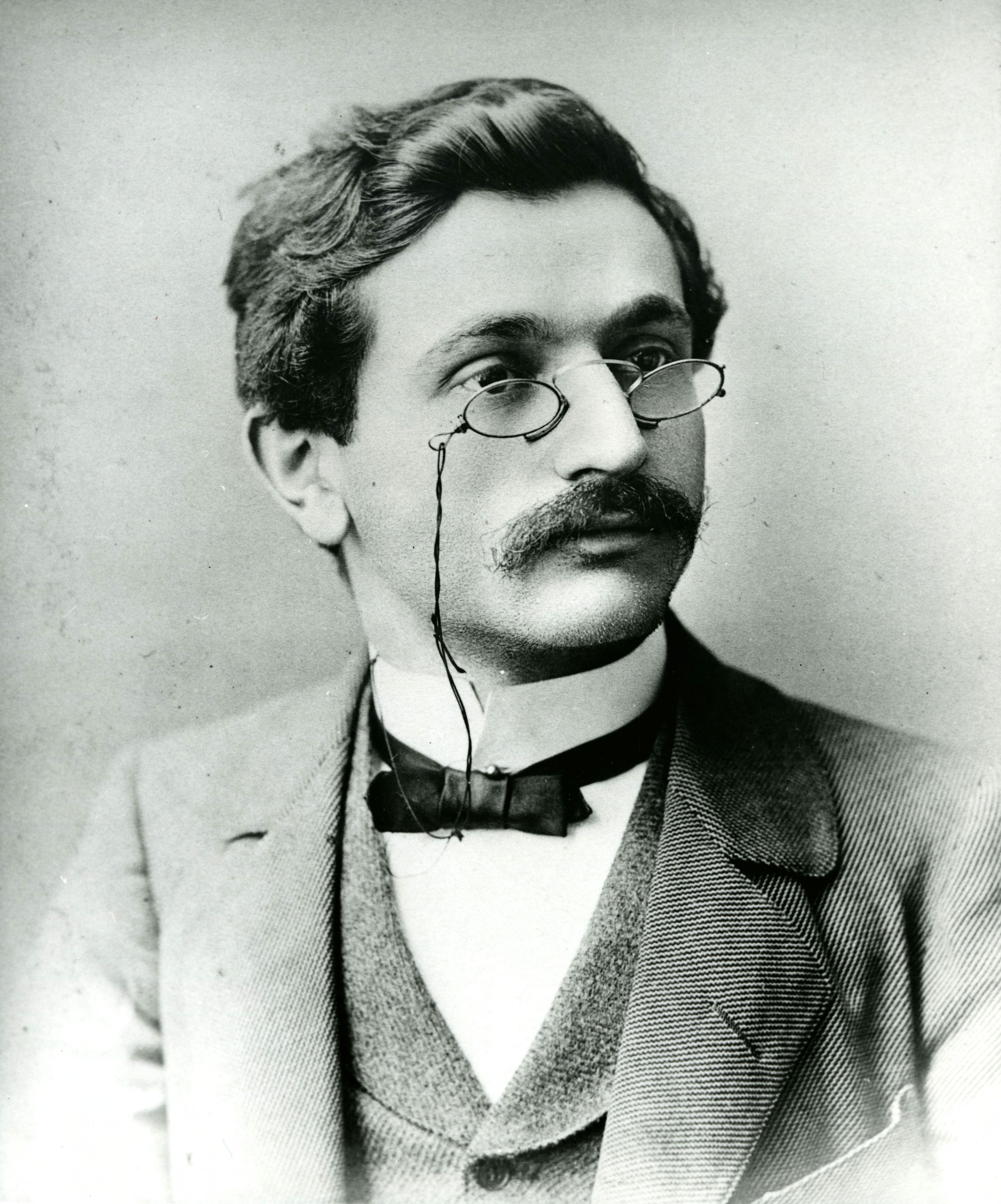
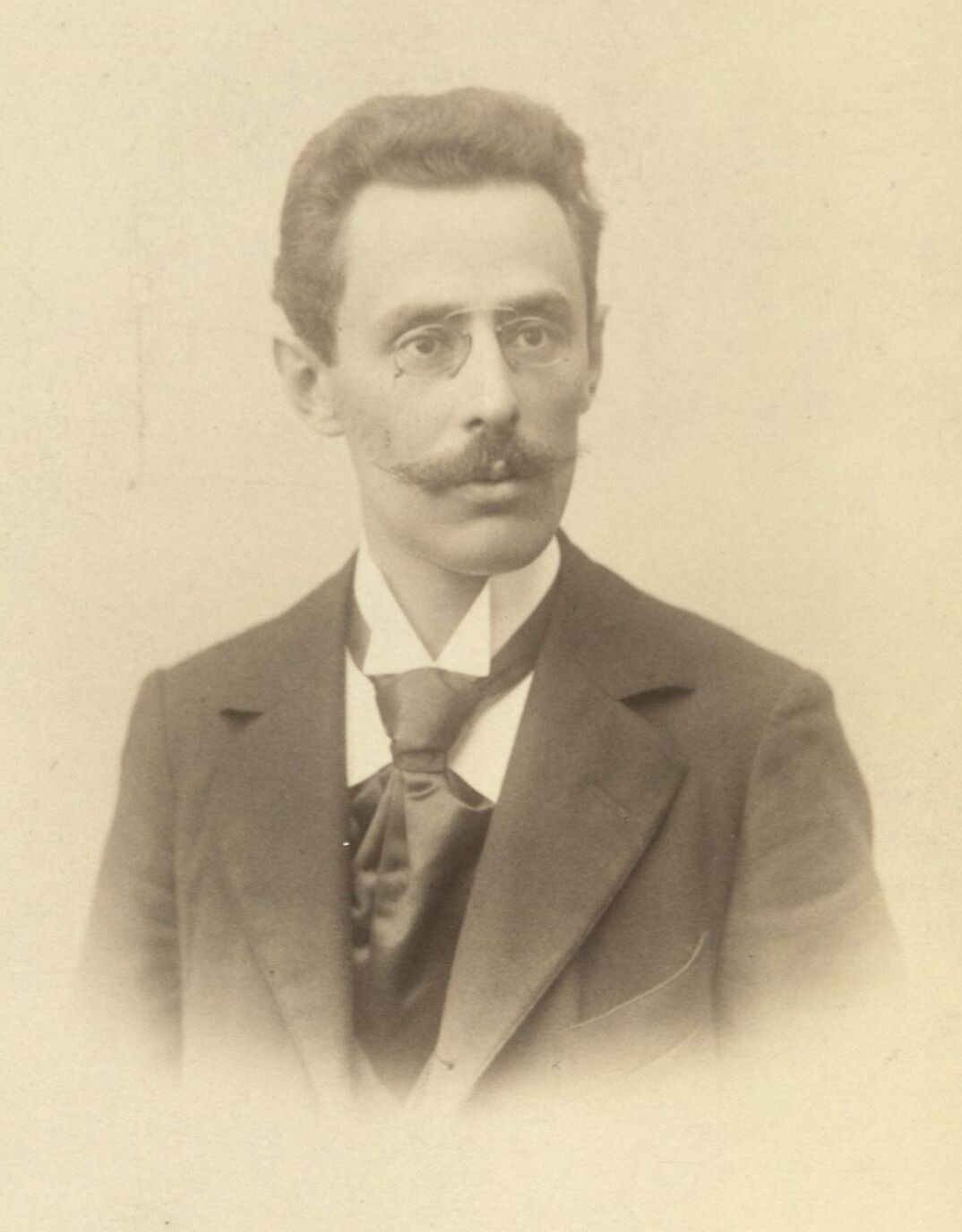
Lasker and challenger Janowski
- Chessmaster Emanuel Lasker retained his world championship, winning the eighth of 11 games at a match in Berlin against David Janowski.

== December 9, 1910 (Friday) ==
- Aviator Georges Legagneux became the first person to fly an airplane higher than 10,000 feet, reaching an altitude of 10,499 feet in a Bleriot monoplane while over the Pau airfield near Paris.
- Two members of the Cuban House of Representatives traded gunfire on a street in Havana. Sr. Molen died at the scene, and Gen. Sanchez Figuera was mortally wounded.
- A methane gas explosion at the Western Canadian Collieries mine in Bellevue, Alberta, killed 30 men out of 42 who had gone underground.
- The proposed state constitution for Arizona was adopted by a vote of 40–12 by delegates, and submitted for voter approval on February 9, 1911. A controversial provision, permitting the recall of judges, was included, but then removed after President Taft objected to it.
- Divide County, North Dakota, was established.

== December 10, 1910 (Saturday) ==
- The city of San Joaquin was incorporated in the Iloilo province of the Philippines.
- The government of Turkey survived a vote of confidence in the Chamber of Deputies by a margin of 123 to 63.
- A mutiny of Brazilian marines was put down by cannon fire a day after the group had seized control of a fort on Cobra Island, near Rio de Janeiro. Two hundred mutineers were killed or seriously wounded.
- The results of the 1910 United States census were announced by the U.S. Census Bureau, which reported that on April 15, 1910, the population of the continental United States, was 91,972,266. Adding Alaska, Hawaii, the Philippines, American Samoa, and the Canal Zone brought the number to 101,100,000.
- Composed by Giacomo Puccini, conducted by Arturo Toscanini, and starring Enrico Caruso, Emmy Destinn and Pasquale Amato, the opera La fanciulla del West was performed for the first time, premiering at the Metropolitan Opera House in New York.
- An underground explosion at a mine in Bellevue, Alberta, Canada kills 31 people.

== December 11, 1910 (Sunday) ==
- In Paris, French inventor Georges Claude first demonstrated the neon lamp, using an electric current and a sealed tube of neon gas, and opening a new era in signage.
- Born:
  - Willard R. Espy, American wordsmith; in Olympia, Washington (d. 1999)
  - Noel Rosa, Brazilian songwriter; in Rio de Janeiro (d. 1937)
  - Harry Gold, Swiss-born American chemist and spy; as Henrich Golodnitsky in Bern (d. 1972)

== December 12, 1910 (Monday) ==
- U.S. President William H. Taft made three nominations to the U.S. Supreme Court on the same day, proposing Edward D. White for Chief Justice, and Joseph R. Lamar and Willis Van Devanter as associate justices. White, an associate justice since 1894, was confirmed as Chief Justice "within less than an hour after his name was sent in", but "The speed with which the confirmation ... was accomplished surprised even staid old senators."
- Actors and actresses in silent films were regularly using profane and indecent expressions, perceptible only to lipreaders, according to a deaf education teacher who filed a complaint with the film censorship bureau in Cleveland. Mrs. Elmer E. Bates brought the matter to national attention after taking a Cleveland newspaper reporter on a tour of the city's theaters. The reporter, in turn, wrote down what she said that the actors were actually saying, "and at times the language was so vile that she had to stop".
- Perfume heiress Dorothy Arnold left her parents' apartment in Manhattan to go shopping. After leaving a book shop, the 25-year-old was never seen or heard from again. Her family waited until January 26 to allow police to make the case public, for fear that their daughter's disappearance would lead to a major societal scandal. Her father spent the rest of his life searching for his daughter, spending at least $100,000 on the case before his death in 1922. Numerous false sightings appeared for decades thereafter, as late as 1935 when she would have been 51, but no conclusive evidence was ever proven as to her fate.

== December 13, 1910 (Tuesday) ==
- Levi R. Lupton, an internationally renowned Pentecostal leader who was celebrated by his followers as the "20th Century Apostle of the Gift of Tongues", admitted to adultery in a letter to his "sisters" and "brothers" within the movement. Lupton said that he had "been sorely tempted and fallen" for an unmarried employee at the Mission headquarters in Alliance, Ohio, and that he had been forgiven by his wife.

== December 14, 1910 (Wednesday) ==
- The U.S. Department of Justice announced that it would commence anti-trust proceedings against the "Electrical Trust", alleging that the General Electric and Westinghouse companies had signed agreements with 17 associations of smaller "manufacturers of almost every article employed in the use of electricity".
- Ten coal miners were killed in an explosion at the Greene Mine near Norton, Virginia. Two miners survived by breaking into an air pipe that led to the surface.

== December 15, 1910 (Thursday) ==
- New York City's Ritz-Carlton Hotel broke a gender barrier when it permitted a woman to smoke in its dining room. "A horrified guest reported to the manager that a woman was smoking in public," wrote the Washington Post, and the manager broke with the custom, adding "I certainly should much prefer to see a woman smoking than drinking a cocktail."
- Bands of Bedouin warriors attacked and massacred Turkish officers at several military outposts.
- Born: John H. Hammond, American talent scout who advanced the fame of performers from Benny Goodman to Bruce Springsteen; Rock and Roll Hall of Fame inductee; in New York City (d. 1987)
- Died: Joel Cook, 68, recently reelected U.S. Representative from Pennsylvania

== December 16, 1910 (Friday) ==
- In a battle at La Junta, Mexico, rebels won a victory over government troops.
- Died: Eli Perkins (pen name of Melville De Lancey Landon), 71, American humorist, author of Wit, Humor and Pathos (1883)

== December 17, 1910 (Saturday) ==
- U.S. Vice-President James S. Sherman, in his capacity as President of the U.S. Senate, offered a new interpretation of quorum, calling a vote with 53 of the 94 Senators absent. Sherman's ruling, which was that if one state's Senator was present, then the other Senator from that state should be counted for a quorum, was thrown out two days later by a 37–17 vote.
- In Russia, all of the editions of five of that nation's newspapers were seized after the publication of a radical speech made in the Duma by Deputy Purishkevich.

== December 18, 1910 (Sunday) ==
- Aviator Henry Farman set an airplane endurance record by remaining in the air for 8 hours and 13 minutes, while flying above the Étampes airfield in France. The previous record had been 6 hours, set by Maurice Tabuteau on October 28. Flight magazine reported the event as taking place on Saturday, December 17.
- The New York Times Magazine reported that "The aeroplane and automobile have caused a new disease," citing reports from English physicians that "when men pass rapidly through the air, the pressure on the face from fast driving prevents the expulsion of poisoned air from the lungs. The carbonic acid gas is forced back into the body. Only a little of it can get away, because of the air pressing on the face. The gas is rebreathed and poisons the system." The suggested remedy was "a mouthpiece to be strapped to the face with tubes extending from it on either side to the back of the head".

== December 19, 1910 (Monday) ==
- At the conclusion of voting in British parliamentary elections, the coalition government increased its majority. Of the 660 seats contested, the Conservatives had a plurality (272, compared to the Liberals 271), but Prime Minister Asquith formed a coalition of Liberals, Irish nationalists and Labour MPs for a total of 398. Harold St Maur defeated Henry Duke in the race for the Exeter constituency by four votes (4,786 to 4,782) but the result would be reversed on a recount on April 11, 1911, with the invalidation of 15 ballots a finding that Duke had won by a single vote, 4,777 to 4,776.
- Captain Yoshitoshi Tokugawa of the Japanese Army, who had trained in France, made the first flight of an airplane in Japan, taking off in a Farman biplane, and landing at a field near Tokyo. The site is now occupied by Yoyogi Park.
- Ten people were killed and 125 injured in a gas explosion at the Grand Central Station in New York.
- The Hawthorne Bridge over the Willamette River in Portland, Oregon, opened.
- Born: Jean Genet, French novelist; in Paris (d. 1986)

== December 20, 1910 (Tuesday) ==
- Hiram C. Gill, the Mayor of Seattle, Washington, was made subject to a recall election after a petition had been signed by 11,000 voters. Gill was voted out of office on February 7.
- The Servicio de Aviación Militar en Chile, forerunner of the Chilean Air Force (Fuerza Aérea de Chile), was established under the command of Lt. Col. Pedro Pablo Dartnell.

== December 21, 1910 (Wednesday) ==
- An explosion at the Hulton Colliery Company, near Bolton, killed 360 British coal miners. The blast at 7:50 in the morning, and the subsequent filling of the mine with carbon monoxide, killed all but three people in the No. 3 and No. 4 pits.
- At a factory on Bodine Street in Philadelphia, a fire killed 14 men and injured 40 others.

== December 22, 1910 (Thursday) ==
- Aviator Cecil Grace departed from Swingate in his airplane in an attempt to win a prize of £4,000 (roughly $20,000) for the longest flight from England to a point in Europe. He was last seen flying into a fog, but never heard from again, nor was any wreckage found after days of searching.
- Twenty-one firemen were killed in Chicago after a building collapsed on them during a fire at the Union Stock Yards. A monument was erected, in memory of the men, more than 93 years later in August 2009. It was the single greatest loss of firefighters in the United States until the September 11th attacks.

== December 23, 1910 (Friday) ==
- By a 108–20 vote, Spain's Congress of Deputies passed the "padlock bill" into law, barring the creation of any new religious orders for two years. Debate ceased after the opposition said they would stop talking "out of pity for the stenographers". The Senate had approved the measure on November 4, 149–58.
- Ramon Barros Luco was inaugurated as the fourth President of Chile during the 1910 calendar year, preceded by the late Pedro Montt, the late Elías Fernández Albano, and Emiliano Figueroa.
- Died: Pierre M.F. Frederique, 44, Haitian journalist and statesman.

== December 24, 1910 (Saturday) ==
- A fiery train crash at Kirkby Stephen, in northern England, killed 27 people. The "Scotch Express" was carrying 500 persons home from England to Scotland when it derailed
- China's National Assembly adopted a resolution denying the right of the Emperor to reject their demands for a democratic constitution. Two days later, the Assembly reconsidered after an edict was issued suggesting that the demands would eventually be granted.
- Died: Franz von Ballestrem, 76, former President of the German Reichstag (1898–1907)

== December 25, 1910 (Sunday) ==
- Texas Governor Thomas M. Campbell pardoned about 100 men, including the first pardon of 50 "friendless" prisoners who had been serving life terms. "Some have been in prison so long that their existence seems to have been forgotten," wrote one account.
- A Missouri Pacific Railroad train was held up by a Christmas Day bandit, who boarded at Leavenworth, Kansas, and then entered the Pullman car shortly after the train pulled out, moving on to the chair cars and the smoking car "until he had held up every passenger".

== December 26, 1910 (Monday) ==
- Aviator Arch Hoxsey set a new altitude record for an airplane, ascending to 11,474 feet over Los Angeles. Hoxsey flew over Mount Wilson on Thursday, and was killed in a crash on Saturday.
- Died: Clara Swain, 76, American physician and missionary, and the first woman to travel to the Orient to administer medical treatment.

== December 27, 1910 (Tuesday) ==
- Northern Bank of New York and all its nine branches in New York City and deposits of almost $7,000,000 was closed by the State Banking Department after it was determined that its chairman, Joseph G. Robin, had diverted hundreds of thousands of dollars for his own speculation in the stock market. Washington Savings Bank (New York) and Carnegie Trust Company, also operated by Robin, were closed two days later. Biographer Thomas G. Riggio concluded that Robin was the inspiration for the protagonist in Theodore Dreiser's story "Vanity, Vanity" and for the character of Jay Gatsby in F. Scott Fitzgerald's novel The Great Gatsby.
- Died: Green McCurtain, 62, principal chief of the Choctaw Nation of Oklahoma since 1902

== December 28, 1910 (Wednesday) ==
- At the northern Korean city of Sonchon, a meeting between the Japanese Governor-General (Terauchi Masatake) and the foremost American Christian missionary (George M. McCune) was the occasion of a failed attempt to assassinate Terauchi. The Korean independence group Shinminhoe (New People's Association) was implicated, and Japan accused the missionary group of conspiracy. Hundreds of Koreans and foreign missionaries were arrested and held for more than two years. A group of 105 Koreans were convicted of treason and sentenced to hard labor. The incident, also called the "Christian Conspiracy Case", is referred to in Korean history as Paego-in sakkon, the 105-Man Incident.
- Alexandre Laffont and Mario Pola were killed when their Antoinette VII monoplane collapsed in mid-air. The duo were flying from Issy-les-Moulineaux aerodrome to Brussels, Belgium, in an aviation tournament. This was the second and final multiple fatality airplane accident in 1910 after the December 3 crash.
- Died: Benjamin Pitman, 88, pioneer who invented the Pitman shorthand system and lobbied for simplified spelling.

== December 29, 1910 (Thursday) ==
- Oklahoma City became the capital of Oklahoma at 8:40 in the evening, as Governor Charles N. Haskell signed the legislation while dining at an eating house at the Santa Fe Railroad train station at Guthrie, which had been the state capital since Oklahoma attained statehood in 1907.
- Seventeen employees were killed, and 12 injured, in a boiler explosion at the Morewood Lake Ice Company, near Pittsfield, Massachusetts.
- Born:
  - Ronald Coase, British economist, 1991 Nobel Prize in Economics laureate; in Willesden, Middlesex (d. 2013)
  - Konsta Jylhä, Finnish violinist; in Kaustinen (d. 1984)
- Died: Reginald Doherty, 38, British tennis player who won four consecutive Wimbledon singles titles (1897–1900)

== December 30, 1910 (Friday) ==
- A nova (later referred to as DI Lacertae), was spotted in the constellation Lacerta, by Anglican minister and astronomer T.H.E.C. Espin, who was the first human to see the birth of the new star. With an estimated average distance of 1,569 parsecs (5,117 light years, plus or minus as much as 166 light years), DI Lacertae had exploded sometime before the year 3040 BC and its light took 50 centuries to be seen from Earth.
- Cornell University Professor Walter F. Willcox delivered his address, "The Change in the Proportion of Children in the United States and the Birth-Rate in France During the Nineteenth Century", to a meeting of the American Statistical Association in St. Louis. Citing the steady decline in the birth rate in the United States since 1870, Willcox said that, statistically speaking, if the trend continued, births would cease by 2015. Though recognized as hyperbole, the address made front-page news as a talking point about what Theodore Roosevelt had described as "race suicide" (for the White race).
- Born: Paul Bowles, American author; in Jamaica, Queens, New York City (d. 1999)

== December 31, 1910 (Saturday) ==
- "America's two foremost aviators, John B. Moisant and Archibald Hoxsey, fell to death yesterday at widely separated cities," read a report the next day in The New York Times. At 9:45 a.m. at Harahan, Louisiana, near New Orleans, John B. Moisant fell out of his airplane from an altitude of 100 feet (30 m). Hours later, Archibald Hoxsey was told of Moisant's death before attempting a new altitude record in Los Angeles, and said to reporters, "From what I hear, Moisant was careless ... it is too bad, but accidents are liable to happen to all of us." After flying to an altitude of about 7,000 feet (2,100 m), Hoxsey was at 800 feet (240 m) when his plane suddenly plunged to the ground.
- Died: Marion Hedgepeth, 53, American outlaw, was shot and killed during an attempted robbery of a saloon in Chicago.
