= Washington Savings Bank =

Washington Savings Bank can refer to a number of banking institutions:

- Washington Savings Bank, an Effingham, Illinois bank founded in 1884
- Washington Mutual Savings Bank (1889-2008), a Seattle-based bank founded as the Washington National Building Loan and Investment Association, and, as of 2009, the largest bank failure in American history
- George Washington Savings Bank, a Chicago bank founded in 1889
- Washington Savings Bank, a Lowell, Massachusetts bank founded in 1892
- Washington Savings Bank (1897-1910), an early 20th-century bank based in New York City
- Washington Savings Bank, a Philadelphia bank founded in 1903
- WaFd Bank, formerly known as Washington Federal Savings, a Seattle-based bank operating in 13 states, founded in 1917 as Ballard Savings and Loan Association
- The Washington Savings Bank, F.S.B, a Maryland bank founded in 1982 as Bay State Savings and Loan Association
