= November 1910 =

Month of 1910

<<	November 1910					>>
Su	Mo	Tu	We	Th	Fr	Sa
		1	2	3	4	5
6	7	8	9	10	11	12
13	14	15	16	17	18	19
20	21	22	23	24	25	26
27	28	29	30

The following events occurred in November 1910:

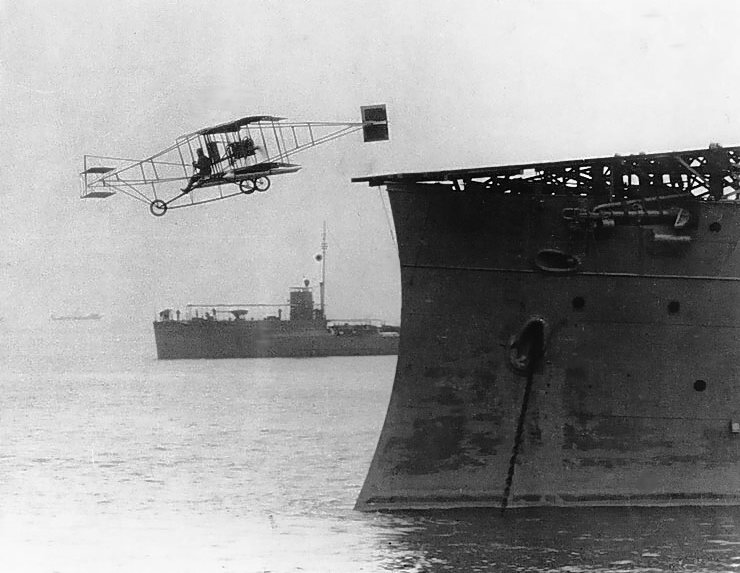
November 14, 1910: Pilot Eugene Ely makes the first takeoff from a ship

== November 1, 1910 (Tuesday) ==
- In legislative elections in Cuba, the Liberal Party retained control despite gains by the Conservatives.
- A plot to overthrow the government of Peru was foiled.
- Tsar Nicholas II of Russia approved a measure extending the area in which Russian Jews could reside.

== November 2, 1910 (Wednesday) ==
- Portugal's military forces threatened to overthrow the newly created Republic after pay raises were slow in coming.

== November 3, 1910 (Thursday) ==
- General Tanaka Giichi established the Teikoku Zaigo Gunjinkai (Imperial Military Reserve Association), open to former members of Japan's Army as well as to civilian volunteers. By 1936, there were three million members of the association, providing political support for military control of Japan.
- The expulsion of the last of the religious orders from Portugal was concluded, with the deportation of 50 Jesuits.
- President Taft issued "an emphatic denial", following a meeting with the Panamanian ambassador, C.C. Arosemena, of rumors that the United States was considering the annexation of the Republic of Panama, .

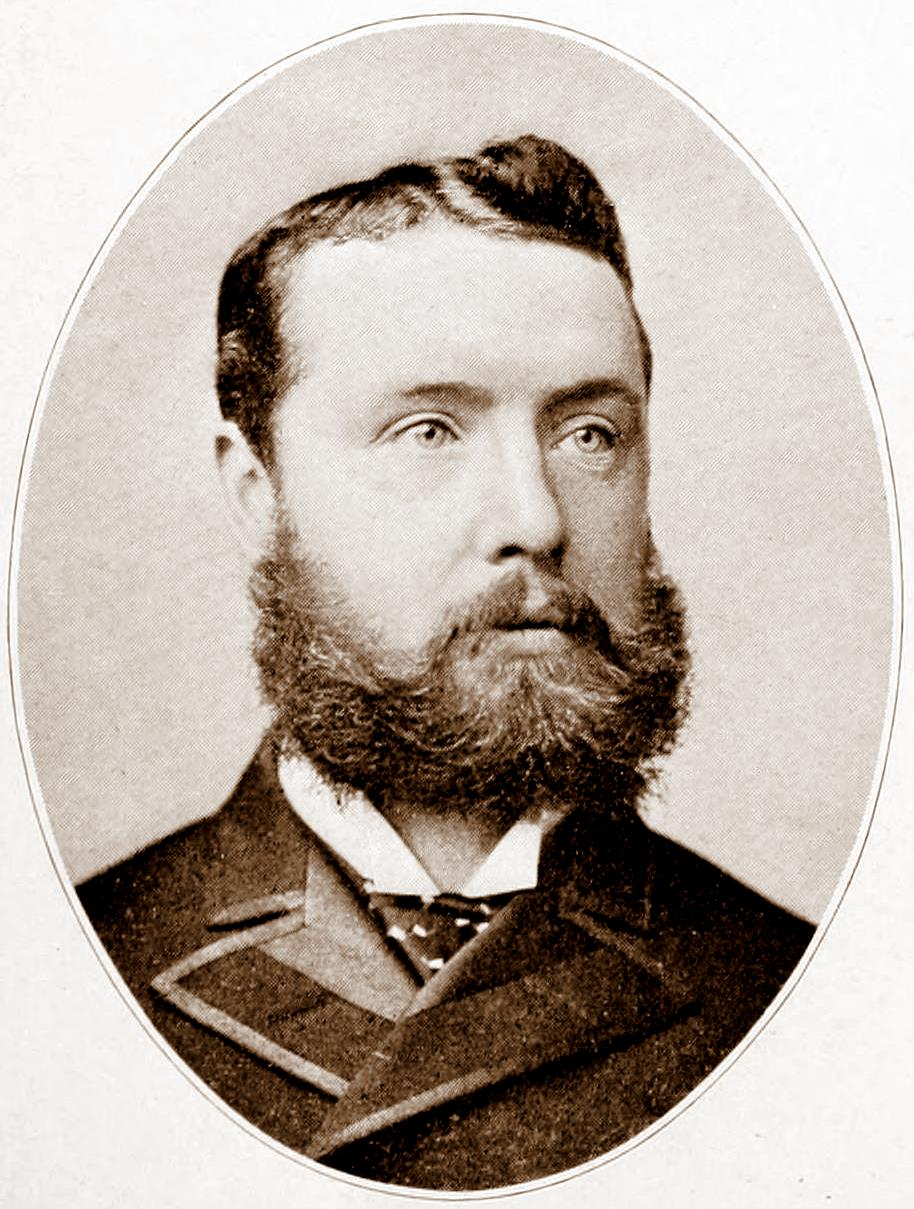
The first famous Hugh Grant

- Born: Agda Rössel, Swedish diplomat who served as Sweden's ambassador to the United Nations from 1958 to 1964; in Gällivare (d. 2001)
- Died: Hugh Grant, 55, former mayor of New York City (1889–1892)

== November 4, 1910 (Friday) ==
- Prince Arthur, Duke of Connaught, appearing on behalf of his nephew, George V of the United Kingdom, opened the very first session of the Parliament of the Union of South Africa.

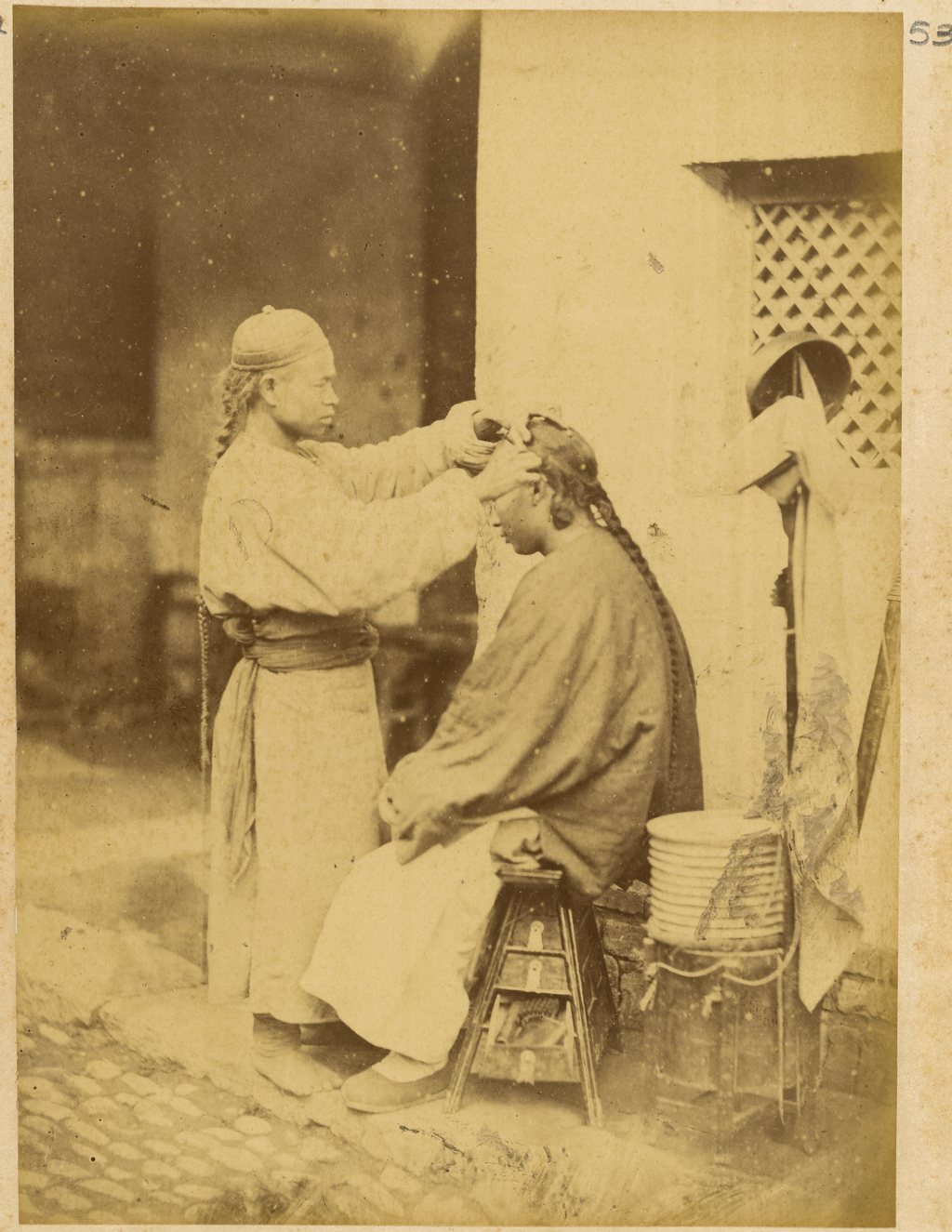
The traditional queue

- An Imperial edict directed that all Chinese diplomats abroad must cut their hair to remove their queues, and to "wear their hair as is the practice of the countries in which they are stationed."
- Another Imperial decree was issued by the regent in the name of the Emperor of China, moving up the date for the creation of the first Chinese Parliament, from 1915 to 1913.
- Tsar Nicholas II of Russia arrived in Potsdam as a guest of Kaiser Wilhelm II of Germany. From their discussions came the Potsdam agreement of 1910 signed on 19 August 1911 to divide their spheres of influence in Persia.
- The Insane Asylum in Brandon, Manitoba, was destroyed by fire, but all 600 of the inmates were rescued.

== November 5, 1910 (Saturday) ==
- Portugal's government granted amnesty to all political prisoners and cut the sentences of other criminals by one-third.
- Indiana University held what it claims to be the first homecoming game, a football game that would coincide with an invitation for the alumni to visit the campus after graduation. Credit for inventing the idea of an alumni "homecoming" has also been claimed for earlier games by Baylor University, and Indiana's opponent that day, the University of Illinois. Indiana and Illinois played to a 0–0 tie that day.
- Residents of Boggy, Florida, gave their city the more pleasant name of Niceville.
- What has been described as "The Post-Impressionist Scandal" took place in London, where the Grafton Galleries displayed the paintings of Paul Cézanne, Henri Matisse, Paul Gauguin, and Vincent van Gogh. British critics compared Post-Impressionism to anarchism in the art world.

== November 6, 1910 (Sunday) ==
- The five masted sailing rigger Preussen, at 408 feet and 5,081 tons, the largest non-engine powered ship of all time, was destroyed after being rammed in the English Channel by the steamer SS Brighton.
- Sculptures of Vishnu, dating from the 9th Century, were unearthed by archaeologists at Sahebganj in Jharkhand in northern British India.
- Born: Erik Ode (stage name for Fritz Erik Odemar), German film and TV actor who starred as the title character in the West German detective series Der Kommissar from 1969 to 1976; in Berlin (d. 1983)
- Died: Giuseppe Cesare Abba, 72, Italian patriot and writer

== November 7, 1910 (Monday) ==
- The first commercial airplane flight in history was carried out by Wright Company pilot Philip Parmalee, who transported two bolts of silk (worth $1,000) from Dayton, Ohio, to Columbus, for delivery to the Morehouse-Martens Department Store in Columbus.
- HMCS Rainbow arrived at Esquimault, British Columbia, to begin her service as the second ship of the Royal Canadian Navy, and the only RCN ship to patrol Canada's Pacific coast. The other RCN ship, HMCS Niobe was used in the Atlantic.
- The towns of Taft, California, and Granum, Alberta, were both incorporated.
- The comic operetta Naughty Marietta, produced by Victor Herbert, premiered on Broadway, at The New York Theatre.
- Some sources list November 7 as the date of Leo Tolstoy's death, based on the old-style Julian calendar used in Russia at the time. In the Gregorian calendar used by the rest of the world and later adopted by Russia, the date was November 20.
- Died: Florencio Sánchez, 35, a Uruguayan playwright, died of tuberculosis.

== November 8, 1910 (Tuesday) ==
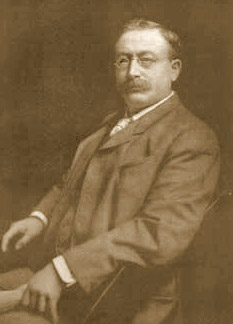
Socialist Congressman Berger

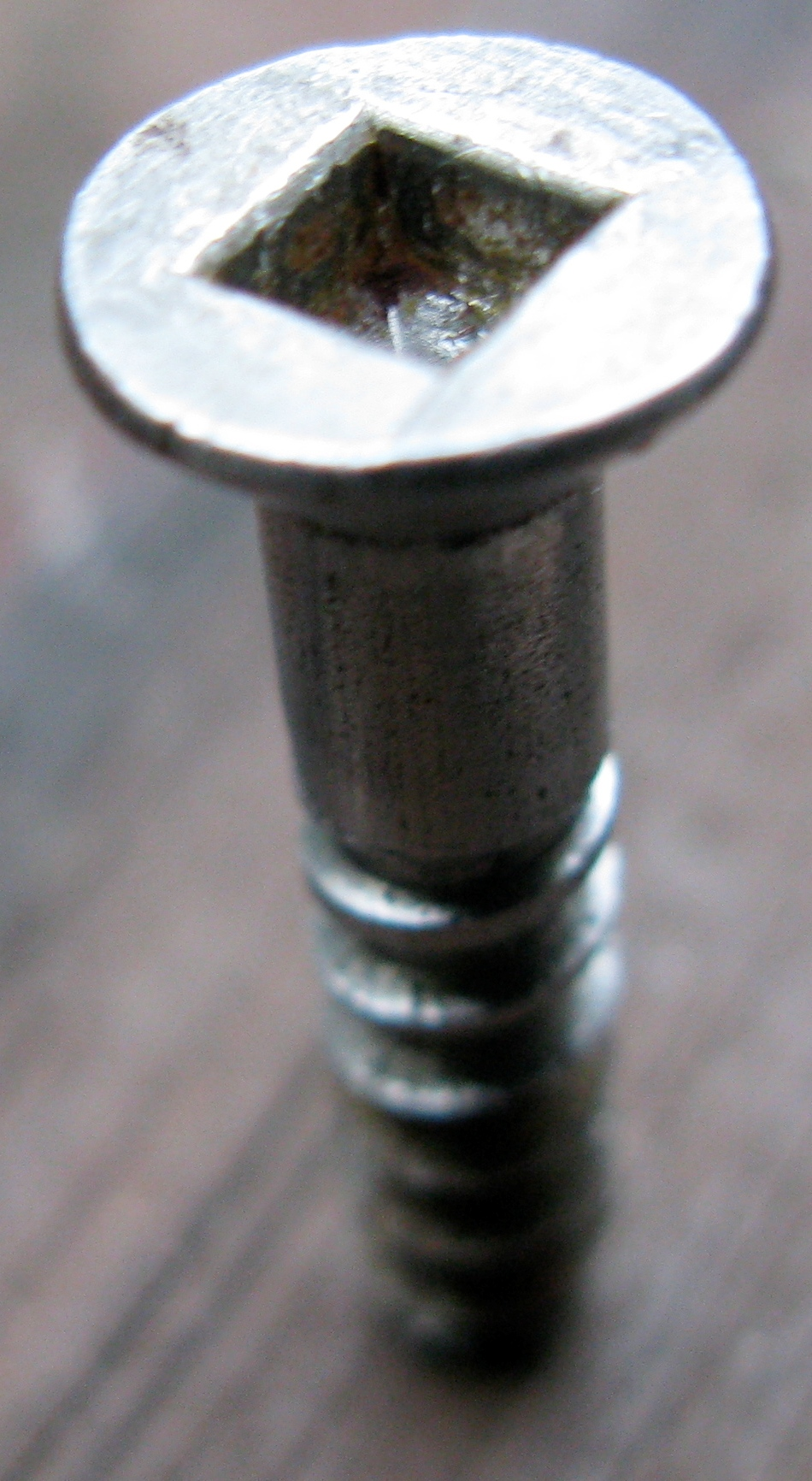
A Robertson screw

- In elections for the U.S. Congress, the Republican Party lost 57 seats and its 219 to 172 majority in the House. The 62nd United States Congress would have 230 Democrats, 162 Republicans, one Progressive Republican, and the first Socialist ever elected to Congress, incoming U.S. Representative Victor L. Berger of Milwaukee. At the time, United States Senators were elected by the legislatures in the 46 states, rather than popular vote, and the Republicans retained a 50–44 majority in the Senate. The race for New York's 36th congressional district, which included Buffalo, Democrat Charles Bennett Smith defeated the incumbent, Republican De Alva S. Alexander, by a single vote, 20,685 to 20,684.
- An explosion at a Victor-American Fuel and Iron Company mine at Delagua, Colorado, killed 76 coal miners.
- Canadian entrepreneur P. L. Robertson received a patent (U.K. No. 975,285) for the Robertson screwdriver, designed to turn a square-holed screw that he had created in 1907. The Robertson screw is not common in the U.S. (where it is called the "square drive screw") but "accounts for over 75% of all screws sold in Canada".
- Industrial action in the coal mining Rhondda Valley led to clashes between striking miners and police forces, culminating in the Tonypandy riots. Winston Churchill damaged his reputation in south Wales by quelling the trouble with troops.

== November 9, 1910 (Wednesday) ==
- Twenty-six people were convicted of conspiracy to assassinate the Emperor of Japan. "In the 2,500 years of that empire's history", noted the New York Times, "the reverence of the people for the sovereign had been such that there had never been even a suggestion of an attack on the life of a Mikado."
- French colonial troops fought a battle in the Ouaddai War at Doroté in the Masalit occupied region of eastern Chad against 5,000 soldiers in the combined armies of the sultans Doudmourah of Ouadai and the Tadj ed Din of the Masalit. France reported that the Sultan of Masalit and 600 of the African soldiers were killed, and that the French forces lost 34 of their tirailleurs infantry men and an officer, Lieutenant Colonel Henri Moll. News did not reach France for nearly a month.

== November 10, 1910 (Thursday) ==
- In what was described as "the first conviction on finger print evidence in the history of this country", a jury in Chicago found Thomas Jennings guilty of the September 19 murder of Clarence A. Hiller.
- President Taft left the United States to visit Panama, on board the USS Tennessee, for an inspection of construction on the Panama Canal, arriving there on November 14. "Taft Sails For Panama", New York Times, November 11, 1910, p7
- An agreement for a four-nation loan of $50 million to China was signed in London.

== November 11, 1910 (Friday) ==
- The governments of the United States, Germany, Russia, Sweden and Norway gave diplomatic recognition to the newly created Republic of Portugal, which had overthrown the Kingdom of Portugal one month earlier.
- The village of Kinney, Minnesota, was incorporated.

== November 12, 1910 (Saturday) ==
- Rudolph Munk, captain of the West Virginia Mountaineers football team, died from injuries sustained in an October 15 game against visiting Bethany College. Thomas McCoy, a right end for Bethany, was charged the next day with murder, but exonerated by a coroner's jury a day later.

== November 13, 1910 (Sunday) ==
- General Jose Valladares, leader of an insurgency against the government of the Honduras, surrendered control of the town of Amapala and gave himself up after a promise of leniency by Honduran President Miguel R. Dávila.
- Guglielmo Marconi successfully transmitted wireless signals between Nova Scotia and Italy.
- Sun Yat-sen and other Chinese exiles met in the Malayan city of Panang to plan the Huanghuagang Uprising, which would take place on April 27, 1911, and would precede the 1911 Revolution.
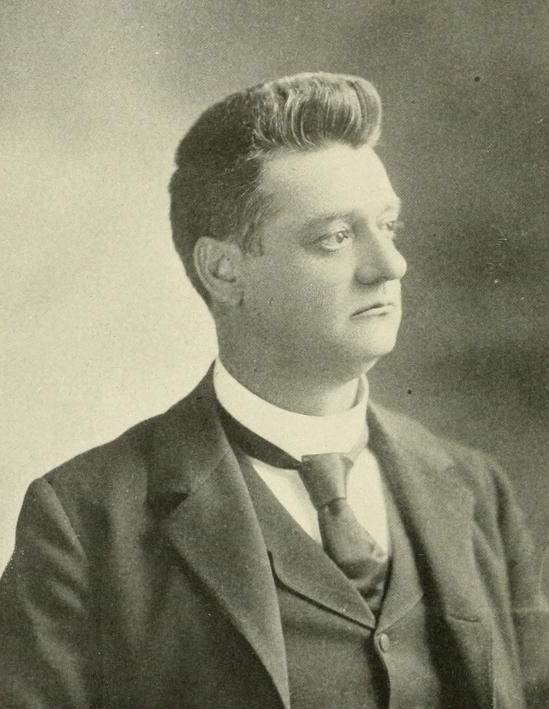
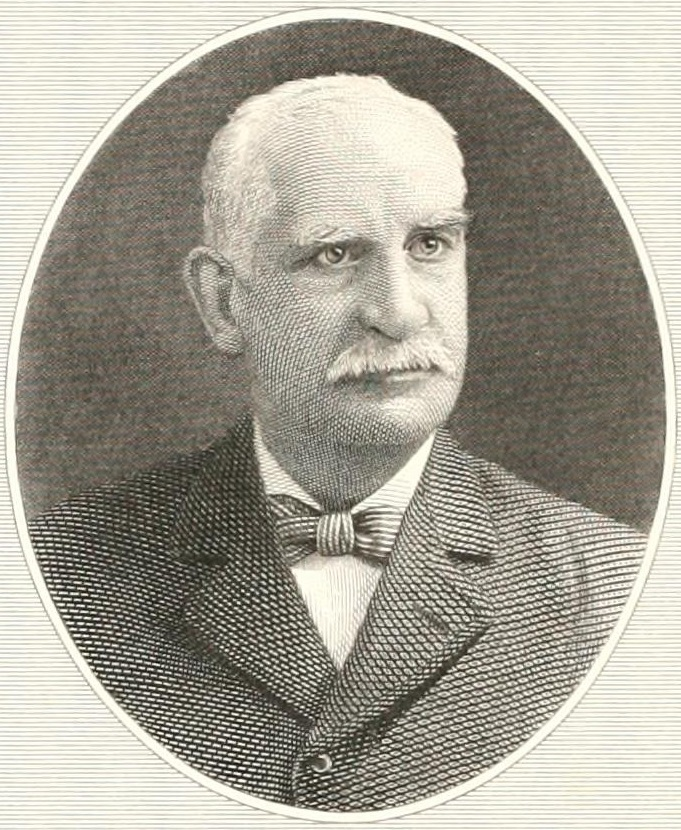
Senator Clay, Congressman Foulkrod
- Died:
  - Alexander S. Clay, 56, U.S. Senator from Georgia since 1897
  - William W. Foulkrod, 64, U.S. Representative from Pennsylvania since 1907. Representative Foulkrod had lost his bid for re-election five days earlier.
  - Louis Nels, 54, German diplomat and former Reichskommissar of German South-West Africa (now Namibia)
  - Isabel Richey, 52, American poet

== November 14, 1910 (Monday) ==
- The feasibility of an aircraft carrier was demonstrated for the first time, as Eugene B. Ely climbed into his airplane on the deck of the cruiser USS Birmingham and executed a takeoff, then flew five miles and landed at Hampton Roads, Virginia. On January 18, 1911, Ely would also become the first person to land an airplane on a ship, bringing his plane down onto the deck of the USS Pennsylvania.
- The town of Souris, Prince Edward Island, was incorporated.
- Died: John LaFarge, 75, American stained glass painter.

== November 15, 1910 (Tuesday) ==
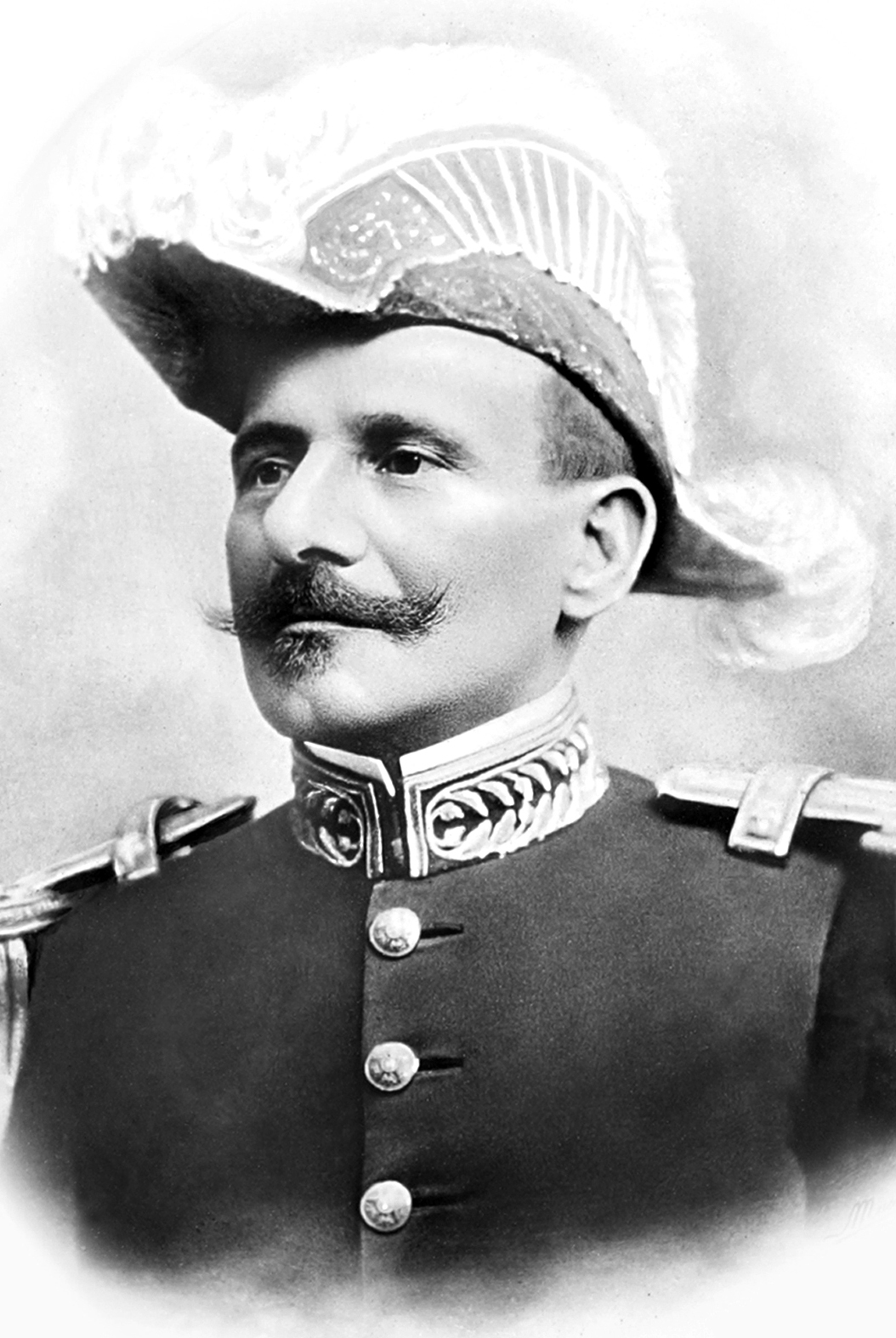
Brazil's President Hermes da Fonseca

- Morocco ceded the territory around Melilla to Spain, and agreed to pay reparations for the Spanish campaign against the Rif tribesmen.
- The Oklahoma Supreme Court ruled that the state's capital should continue to be Guthrie, despite the overwhelming approval of Oklahoma City in a statewide referendum. The decision would be reversed the following year and the capital transferred from Guthrie to Oklahoma City, about 29 miles (47 km) south.
- Hermes da Fonseca was inaugurated as the eighth President of Brazil.
- Died: Wilhelm Raabe, 79, German novelist who also wrote under the pen name Jakob Corvinus.

== November 16, 1910 (Wednesday) ==
- President William H. Taft of the United States, in Panama City for an inspection of the building of the canal, reassured Panamanians that the U.S. had no intention of annexing the Republic of Panama. "We have guaranteed your integrity as a republic, and for us to annex territory would be to violate that guarantee, and nothing would justify it on our part", said Taft, adding "so long as Panama performed her part under the treaty."
- The announcement was made that George V, King of the United Kingdom of Great Britain and Ireland and the British Dominions beyond the Seas, and the first British Emperor of India, would visit India, accompanied by his wife, at the end of 1911, in order to be present at a durbar, where he would meet his Indian subjects on January 1, 1912.

== November 17, 1910 (Thursday) ==
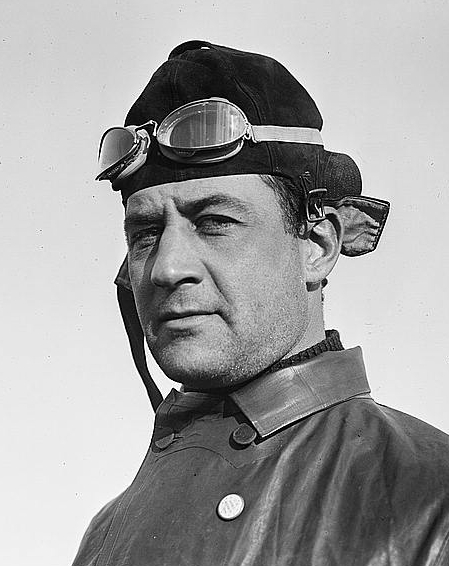
Johnstone

- Ralph Johnstone, who had broken the world record for highest altitude achieved in an airplane (9,714 feet) on October 31, was killed while flying an exhibition at Denver. Johnstone was executing a "spiral glide" when a wingtip crumpled, and he plunged from 500 feet to his death.

== November 18, 1910 (Friday) ==
- In the largest protest to that time for women seeking the right to vote in the United Kingdom, thousands of suffragettes, led by Emmeline Pankhurst, marched to the Palace of Westminster to confront the Parliament over killing a reform proposal. The ensuing confrontation between London police and the women, subsequently known as Black Friday, turned violent, and increased sympathy for the cause of women's suffrage.
- Rioting at Puebla, Mexico, killed more than 100 people. Political leader Aquiles Serdán, who died in a confrontation with government police, is now celebrated as a hero of the 1910 revolution.

== November 19, 1910 (Saturday) ==
- Previously unbeaten and untied (8–0–0), the Harvard University Crimson's football team was unable to score in its closing game, and settled for a 0–0 tie with the twice beaten (6-2-1) Yale University Bulldogs. The Fighting Illini of the University of Illinois closed their season the same day unbeaten, untied and unscored upon with a 3–0 win over visiting Syracuse. The University of Pittsburgh Panthers, with an 8–0–0 record, would also play on Thanksgiving Day (against 5–1–1 Penn State) and finish the season unbeaten, untied and unscored upon.
- Britain's Prime Minister Asquith opened campaigning for the British Parliament.
- Died: Wilhelm Fittig, 74, German chemist who discovered the Wurtz–Fittig reaction for the synthesis of alkylbenzenes

== November 20, 1910 (Sunday) ==
- As called for in his "Plan de San Luis Potosí", Francisco I. Madero made his first attempt at starting the Mexican Revolution, crossing into Mexico from Texas at 6:00 p.m. with ten men and 100 rifles. Finding only ten more men rather than the 400 expected, he returned to Texas to regroup. Reports at the time speculated that he had crossed the Rio Grande at a point between Eagle Pass and Laredo.
- The Portuguese football club Vitória de Setúbal was founded.

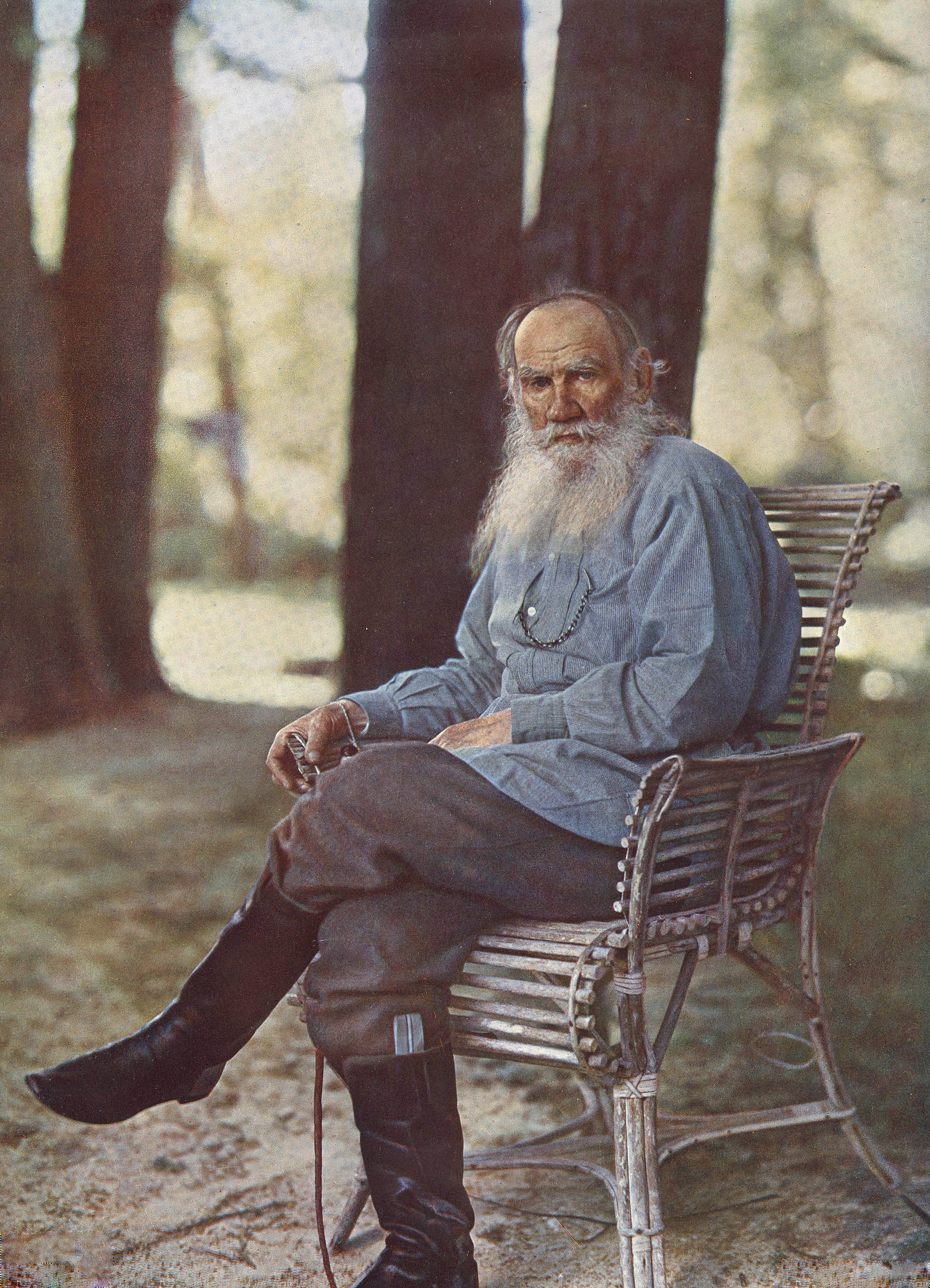
Tolstoy two years before his death

- Born: Pauli Murray, American civil rights activist and Episcopal priest who was the first African-American woman to be ordained to the Episcopal Church clergy; in Baltimore (d. 1985)
- Died: Leo Tolstoy, 82, celebrated as one of Russia's greatest authors. Among his most famous works were the novels War and Peace and Anna Karenina (1869).

== November 21, 1910 (Monday) ==
- Federal agents arrested the principal members of Burr Brothers, Inc., charging them with postal fraud and selling of more than $40,000,000 of fraudulent stock. Sheldon H. Burr, President; Frank H. Tobey, Vice-President; and Eugene H. Burr, Secretary-treasurer, were put under arrest with bond set at $20,000 each. The U.S. Postmaster General, Frank H. Hitchcock, personally appeared in Denver to witness the arrest.
- The Officers' School of Aviation, was founded in Sevastopol, Russia, by Grand Duke Alexander Michaelovitch. The Aviation School would subsequently serve as the primary training site for Russian and Soviet military pilots.

== November 22, 1910 (Tuesday) ==
- Some historians trace the origins of the Federal Reserve Board to a private meeting arranged by multi-millionaire J. P. Morgan and U.S. Senator Nelson Aldrich of Rhode Island, who departed on this day in a private railroad car from Hoboken, New Jersey, to Morgan's private Jekyll Island Club on Jekyll Island, Georgia, "allegedly on a duck-hunting expedition".
- Reports arrived from French Indochina (now Vietnam) that more than 1,000 people had died in recent flooding in Quảng Ngãi Province, and another 100 in Quảng Nam Province.
- At Rio de Janeiro, in what would become known as the Revolt of the Lash, Mutineers in the Brazilian Navy, led by João Cândido, seized control of the new dreadnought battleship Minas Gerais. The revolt spread to her sister ship São Paulo, the older coastal defense ship Deodoro and the new cruiser Bahia. With the ships' guns aimed at the city, the crews delivered their demands for improvements in their conditions. On November 26, the Brazilian government accepted the demands, providing increases in pay, prohibiting the flogging of sailors, and granting amnesty to the mutineers.

== November 23, 1910 (Wednesday) ==
- President William H. Taft returned to the United States after a two-week absence, during which he had visited Panama and Cuba.
- Francisco I. Madero proclaimed himself as "President of the provisional government of Mexico"
- The yacht Visitor II, owned by Commodore W. Harry Brown, became the first vessel to travel on the Panama Canal, which was completed as far as the Gatún lock.
- Pennington County, Minnesota, was established by gubernatorial proclamation.
- Died:
  - Octave Chanute, 78, French-American engineer and aviation pioneer
  - Johan Alfred Ander, 37, Swedish murderer, the last man to be executed in Sweden. He was beheaded by guillotine.
  - Hawley Harvey Crippen, 48, American murderer, was hanged at 9:02 at Britain's Pentonville Prison, after being convicted a month earlier for the murder of his wife.

== November 24, 1910 (Thursday) ==
- The University of Pittsburgh Panthers defeated Penn State, 11–0, to become one of only two major college football teams in the nation to finish unbeaten, untied, and unscored upon. In nine games, Pitt had outscored its opponents 282–0. The other was the Fighting Illini of the University of Illinois, who had outscored their opponents 89 to 0 in completing a 7-0-0 record.
- The British House of Lords unanimously adopted the resolution of Lord Lansdowne for settling differences with the House of Commons.

== November 25, 1910 (Friday) ==
- President Taft announced the first regulations providing for public inspection of corporate tax returns filed with the U.S. Department of the Treasury. The returns of companies listed on any stock exchange would be provided, without restriction, upon request. For other companies, returns would be provided upon a showing of need.
- The Insular Life Assurance Company, Ltd., now the largest mutual life insurer in the Philippines, was established.
- Died: "Queen", 87, an Indian elephant that had performed in circuses since 1886, was put to death in Jersey City, New Jersey with 600 grains of cyanide after having killed her keeper, Robert Schiel, in October. Queen was said to have also killed a little girl several years earlier.

== November 26, 1910 (Saturday) ==
- A fire at a building in Newark, New Jersey, housing several factories, killed 24 women and girls employed by the Wolf Muslin Undergarment Company. The lack of exits and the fire hazards within similar buildings raised concerns about whether a similar disaster could happen. Four months later, on March 25, 1911, the Triangle Shirtwaist Factory fire in New York City would kill 146 garment workers.
- Owen Moran won the lightweight boxing championship by knocking out Battling Nelson in the 11th round at a bout in San Francisco.
- Born: Cyril Cusack, Irish actor; in Durban, South Africa (d. 1993)

== November 27, 1910 (Sunday) ==
- Penn Station, hub of the New York City mass transit system, was opened as the Pennsylvania Railroad inaugurated train service between New Jersey and Manhattan.
- Died: Michael Cudahy, 69, multi-millionaire and founder of Cudahy Packing Company.

== November 28, 1910 (Monday) ==
- The U.S. Department of Justice filed its long-awaited antitrust suit against the Sugar Trust. American Sugar Refining Company of New Jersey controlled most of the sales of sugar in the United States, and owned Spreckels Sugar, Franklin Sugar, and American Sugar Refining of New York. National Sugar Refining Company of New Jersey, the second largest producer, was 25% owned by American Sugar. The defendants in the Trust accounted for 64% of sugar production.
- Thirteen men were killed in an explosion at the Jumbo mine, of the Choctaw Asphalt Company, in Durant, Oklahoma.
- Parliament was dissolved in the United Kingdom.
- The town of Boyce, Virginia, was incorporated.

== November 29, 1910 (Tuesday) ==
- The British Antarctic Expedition, led by Robert Falcon Scott, departed from New Zealand on the Terra Nova. Roald Amundsen, on board the Fram was also en route to the Antarctic continent and would arrive there ahead of Scott.
- On the same day, the Japanese Antarctic Expedition, led by Nobu Shirase, departed Tokyo on the ship Kainan Maru.
- Inventor Ernest E. Sirrine of Chicago received U.S. Patent No. 976,939 for a "street traffic system"
- The Vermont School of Agriculture, first college of agriculture in that state (and now called Vermont Technical College), was established at Randolph Center.

== November 30, 1910 (Wednesday) ==
- On the last day of 1910 hunting season in the United States, the number of fatal accidents exceeded 100, with 113 deaths, a 30% increase over the 1909 record of 87.
- Thomas Edison told a reporter that he had invented "a heavier-than-air flying machine", but that he did not want to discuss it further. "I admit that I have a little patent along aeorplane lines", said the inventor, "but I have too much to do to become interested in the navigation of the air." Edison's flying machine, similar to a helicopter, was described as "a basket hung on a vertical shaft, on the upper end of which revolve box kites or other form of aeroplanes at sufficient speed to lift the whole affair".
