= Disability pension =

Form of pension

A disability pension is a form of pension given to those people who are permanently or temporarily unable to work due to a disability.

== North America ==
An example of a disability pension is from a private or Public Pension Plan, or the Canada Pension Plan. Another example is Social Security Disability Insurance (SSDI) in the United States.

Generally, there is a minimum time of service required to be eligible for the disability retirement benefit. The claimant might be directed to sign a waiver for their medical records to be disclosed and commonly is scheduled for an independent medical evaluation (IME) to confirm they are permanently disabled. The pension is calculated based on years worked, so the disability retiree can retire earlier (since they are unable to work), but receives an equitable pension based on years of service.

== Australasia ==
=== Australia ===
Australian residents of working age who are unable to work for 15 hours a week for the next two years are eligible for the Disability Support Pension. Those intending to claim the DSP need to provide a report from their treating doctor.

Beneficiaries of the Disability Support Pension receive significantly more than those on unemployment benefits; as of 1 October 2023 the basic rate is A$1096.70 per fortnight for singles with a child under care and A$826.70 for each member of a couple.

The Disability Support Pension, previously known as the Invalid Pension, were first introduced in the state of New South Wales in 1908. The Commonwealth government introduced a nationwide Invalid Pension on 5 December 1910.

Australians who are temporarily unable to work due to illness, injury or a short-term disability may be eligible for Sickness Allowance. Sickness Allowance pays less than the DSP; as of 1 January 2009, single recipients were entitled to a basic rate of A$449.30 per fortnight and couples A$405.30 for each person. However Sickness allowance was discontinued since 20 September 2020.

Like all Australian social security payments, eligibility for the DSP is not dependent on individual contributions; rather, benefits are paid out of general Commonwealth government revenue.

=== New Zealand ===
In New Zealand income support exists for people with physical or mental health issues. The two main disability benefits are the Sickness Benefit, and the Invalid's Benefit. A doctor's referral and medical certificate (or equivalent) is needed to claim the benefits. The Invalid's Benefit is for someone who has a severe disability, and/or long term sickness, which is paid slightly more than the Sickness Benefit. In addition, there is the Disability Allowance, to supplement medical costs. If the Disability Allowance does not pay for all medical costs, then Temporary Additional Support is provided, but obtaining it is more difficult. All of these benefits have maximum limits, depending on such things as income (both the individual and their partner) and cash assets. Note that the Sickness Benefit and Invalid's Benefit are for people aged less than 65 but the Disability Allowance is for anyone over 18 years.

=== China ===
According to central government guidelines, the basic pension insurance is set to 40% of the insured monthly wage. The disabled person is also eligible to receive temporary and permanent disability benefits. Temporary benefits are in the amount of 100% of the individual's wage up to one year. There are 10 degrees of disability, with the percentage of the wage that the person receives ranging from 90%(for a first degree disability) to 60% (for a 6th degree disability). In addition to the pension, the person receives a benefit in the amount of 27 months worth of the person's previous wage (for a first degree disability) to 7 months of wages (for a 10th degree disability). The minimum amount of a benefit is determined by the minimum wage in the area.

== Europe ==
=== European Union ===
Disability pension calculations vary depending on the country. Countries like Czech Republic, Estonia, Ireland, Greece, Croatia, Latvia, Hungary, Slovakia, Finland, Sweden and the United Kingdom apply a risk-based logic. In this case the length of the period when the individual was insured is not important, only that he or she was insured when the invalidity occurred. Other countries use a pro-rata method, were the pension is higher for people who had been insured for a longer time.

==== France ====
• To be able to apply for a disability pension or as it is calles in France pension d'invalidité there should be fulfilled the following conditions: 1-Age requirement: The person has not reached yet the legal age for retirement. (for this country is 62 years old.) 2-Working capacity: The person should have significantly lost his/her capability of working. The person must have a permanent disability over 80% (case of blind people) or vary to a range of 50%-60% disability which is the case of people certified as "unable to procure employment due to a disability". 3-Contributions: The person must have paid at least 12 months social security contributions before the day he/she is diagnosed. 4-Nationality: Being French is not a requirement. Having a proof that proves the legality of the residence in the country is necessary.

• Categories For considering the amount of disability benefit there are 2 factors considered: 1) The salary and the social security contributions and 2) The category of the disability. Categories are divided as follow: 1- 1st Category: This category belongs to people who are still able to do some job that can be paid. The benefit is calculated in this form: SAM X 30%. (Average annual income*30%). The maximum annual amount of the pension is equal to 993.30 Euro per month, considering the social security threshold: €11,919.60. 2- 2nd Category: This category belongs to people who are not capable of paid working and cannot perform professional activities anymore. The benefit is calculated in this form: SAM X 50%. (Average annual income*50%). The maximum annual amount of the pension is equal to €1,655.50 per month, considering the SST (social security threshold): €19,866. 3- 3rd Category: This category belongs to people who are not capable of performing paid working and cannot perform professional activities anymore and are obliged to use assistance of a third person to meet the needs of everyday life. Comparing to previous category, the normal pension is increased by 40% reaching the maximum amount of €2,763 per month.

[SAM: Average yearly income. It represents the pension scheme of employees in its 10 best performance which are revalued and divided by 10. (in the case there are 10 years of work) SST: Social security threshold is the maximum total that is defined each year under basis of which contributions and certain social security allowances are calculated.(In 2018 estimation, annual amount was €39,732)

• Allowance for adults that have disabilities. Apart from pension d'invalidité People with significant disabilities and low incomes can manage to receive an addition allowance named as AAH (allocation aux adultes handicapés). To benefit from this additional help, the factor of low income is strongly considered. For example: in 2017 a single disabled person with no children can be considered in AAH benefit only if the income was lower than 9,730.68 EUR per year.

==== United Kingdom ====
In the United Kingdom, the government department responsible for benefits for sick and disabled people is the Department for Work and Pensions (DWP).

The United Kingdom pension types for disabled people are:

- Disability Living Allowance (DLA) which is a benefit for children who have walking difficulties or need personal care due to physical, mental or sensory disability. It was historically also available to people of working age (up to the age of 65)
- Personal Independence Payment (PIP) which is a new benefit for people of working age (between 18 and state pension age), who need help with personal care and/or mobility due to physical or mental disability. PIP will continue to be paid to claimants after they reach state pension age.
- Attendance Allowance (AA) which is a benefit for people over the state pension age (65), who need help with personal care due to physical or mental disability. Since PIP claims continue beyond pension age, AA will effectively be gradually superseded, taking a couple of decades to fade away.

In order to cover loss of income from illness and disability, there is also Statutory Sick Pay, and its long term equivalent - Employment and Support Allowance (ESA). The new Universal Credit scheme will include an equivalent element for those with long-term unfitness to work; ESA will consequently be abolished by the roll out of Universal Credit.

==== Czech Republic ====
There used to be a partial and full disability pensions, but as of 2010, there is no longer a difference between these two types. Depending on how severe the disability of the individual is, (i.e. how much their ability to work has decreased) they can be categorized into one of three degrees of disability. The degree of disability is determined by a health and capacity to work evaluation conducted by the Czech Social Security Administration's evaluation service.

Decrease in ability to work	Degree of disability
35–49%	First degree
50–69%	Second degree
70% and more	Third degree

An individual has to meet certain requirements in order to apply for a disability pension. A person is not eligible for a disability pension if they have already reached the age of 65, when one is already eligible for a standard old-age pension. The applicant must also meet the required term of insurance which rises with rising age. In case of an individual younger than 20 years, less than one year of insurance contributions are required. When the applicant is over 28 years old it is required that he has made at least 5 years of insurance contributions in his past 10 years. At an age higher than 38, 10 ears of previous insurance contributions are required. The required term of insurance is waived if the applicant's disability is from an accident at work or occupational disease or if the applicant has been declared disabled since childhood.

The disability pension consists of two components. The first is a basic amount which is fixed to 9% of average wages (2,700 CZK in 2018) . The second components is a percentage amount from the average of previous wages. The percentage is determined individually from the number of insured years. This amount is higher for higher degrees of disabilities.

==== Portugal ====
An individual is entitled to a disability pension [Pensão de invalidez] when the incompetency to work is certified by Sistema de Verificação de Incapacidades (SVI) [Incapacity Verification System], and the beneficiary has met the minimum qualifying period requirement.

Disability is classified into two categories. It may be relative or absolute. In the case of a relative disability, the beneficiary's earning capacity for their own occupation is reduced, and they are not expected to recover within the next three years, and the beneficiary has registered earnings for at least five calendar years, consecutive or not. In the case of an absolute disability, the beneficiary is permanently and definitively incapable of working in any occupation and has registered earnings for at least 3 calendar years, consecutive or not.

The amount to be paid as a disability pension varies depending on the beneficiary's registered earnings and security contributions. There are minimum rates, for specific time ranges of contributions of the beneficiary. In addition to monthly disability pensions, the beneficiaries receive an extra payment in July and December as a holiday and Christmas bonus.

==== Finland ====
Disability pension in Finland is usually paid to an individual after they have already received a sickness benefit for around a year. In the case of not being able to work in their job or a similar one even after that one year, the individual can apply for a disability pension. "Disability pension can be granted to people aged 18–62 who are part of the earnings-related pension system." In case an individual is unable to work at all (specifically if their ability to work has decreased b at least 3/5), they may receive a full disability pension (työkyvyttömyyseläke). If the individual is partially unable to work (specifically if their ability to work has decreased by 2/5), they may receive a partial disability pension, which is half of the full disability pension.

When calculating the amount of the pension, there is a so-called projected pension component added to the pension. The projected pension component is made if the individual

- earned €17,807.01 in total (in 2019) over 10 calendar years before they became disabled
- paid earnings-related pension insurance on income.

The accrued rate is 1.5% of gross wages for the 5 years prior to disability retirement.

The disability pension can also be increased by a rehabilitation benefit which is an additional 33% of the original pension amount. (2019)
