= Sri Rajagopala Swamy temple =

Sri RajaGopala Swamy Temple Santana Raja Gopala Swamy
- Location in Tamil Nadu Sri Rajagopala Swamy temple (Tamil Nadu)

Religion
- Affiliation: Hinduism
- District: Tanjavur
- Deity: Rajagopalaswamy, Sri Devi, Bhudevi, Senkamalavalli Thaayar
- Festivals: Vaikunta Ekadashi, Koodarai valli
- Features: Temple tank: Chatrakulam

Location
- State: Tamil Nadu
- Country: India
- Interactive map of Sri RajaGopala Swamy Temple; Santana Raja Gopala Swamy
- Coordinates: 10°19′1.57″N 79°21′20.55″E

Architecture
- Type: Dravidian architecture
- Inscriptions: 4

Sri Rajagopalaswamy Temple, also referred to as Santhana Rajagopalaswamy Temple, is a Hindu temple in Rajamadam Village in the Indian state of Tamil Nadu. The deity came in dreams of King Serfoji II (Sarabhoji II Bhonsle) and blessed him with a male child. The king had been praying for an heir. To thank him the king built a temple along with a Madam and constructed Rajamadam village. This deity looks like Rajagopalaswamy of Mannargudi.
