= Rajamadam =

- village
- Location in Tamil Nadu, India Rajamadam (India)
- Coordinates: 10°19′1.57″N 79°21′20.55″E
- Country: India
- State: Tamil Nadu
- District: Thanjavur
- Taluk: Pattukkottai
- Founder: King Serfoji II
- Named for: The Chatram (Madam), built by King (Raja) Serfoji II

Population (2001)
  - Total: 2,304

Languages
  - Official: Tamil
- Time zone: UTC+5:30 (IST)

Rajamadam is a coastal village in the Pattukkottai taluk of Thanjavur district, Tamil Nadu, India. Rajamadam to Adirampattinam is 6 km (3.7 mi) from its Taluk Main Town, Pattukkottai, 15 km (9.3 mi). Rajamadam is 58.1 km (36.1 mi) distant from its District Main City Thanjavur and 320 km (199 mi) distance from its State Main City Chennai. It is the birthplace of the former President of India and an independence activist R. Venkitaraman.

== Etymology ==
The name Rajamadam came from the Tamil words raja and madam. Raja denotes King Saraboji II, who created this village. Madam denotes the shelter or Chattram built by him. There is a Madam still standing in this village with a portrait of King Saraboji II.

== History ==
King Saraboji II built many Madams in Tanjavur district. Some of them are Rajamadam, Sethubava Chatram, Ammani Chatram, etc., for the travellers who are travelling in and around Tanjavur. While constructing a Madam, he also created villages to support the particular Madam. In 1889, he built the Rajamadam village along with the Madam. He created Agraharam, where he relocated Brahmins and he created four main streets, one for each direction surrounding the Agraharam. They are, namely, Keezhatheru (East Street), Melatheru (West Street), Vadaku theru (North Street) and Therku theru (South Street). He constructed two temples at each end of the Agraharam. They were Sri Rajagopala Swamy temple and Sri Kasi Viswanatha Swamy temple. He created a street out of some space remaining after the construction of Sri Rajagopala Swamy temple, and he named it Otha Agraharam (Brahmin houses on only one side of the street). He also constructed village deities for each street. They included Kali Amman Temple, Thachi Amman Temple, and Ganesh Temple. He also constructed various ponds to support the people of this village. They were Chatrakulam (Pond of Madam) which was used by the Agraharam people, travellers and crew of Madam. BavaKulam, named after one of his wives, Sethu Bava, was constructed for North Street. Prakulam was constructed for South Street. Senkankulam was constructed for East Street and Mocha Kulam for West Street. Agriculture started flourishing with the water taken from these ponds as well as the Agniyar River, a tributary of the Cauvery.

== Demographics ==
As per the 2001 census, Rajamadam had a total population of 2,304 with 1,147 males and 1,157 females. The sex ratio was 1009. The literacy rate was 60.95.

== Notable people ==
- R. Venkataraman – 8th President of India
- Rajamadam Kannan Iyengar – The Karnam of Karnams
- Suratha – The Uvamai Kavigyar (Tamil Poet)

== See also ==
- R. Venkataraman
- Suratha
- Sri Rajagopala Swamy temple
- Anna University Campus
