= Keeranur, Pudukkottai =

Keeranur
- Town
- Location in Tamil Nadu, India
- Coordinates: 10°35′44″N 78°46′53″E
- Country: India
- State: Tamil Nadu
- District: Pudukkottai

Population (2001)
  - Total: 9,681

Languages
  - Official: Tamil
- Time zone: UTC+5:30 (IST)
- PIN: 622502
- Telephone code: 04339
- Vehicle registration: TN-55

Keeranur is a panchayat town in Pudukkottai District in the Indian state of Tamil Nadu. It is located 225 km South-East of Coimbatore. The Uthama Nathaswami Sivan Temple is of a Mutharaya edifice and contains epigraphs of Cholas and Vijayanagar Empires.

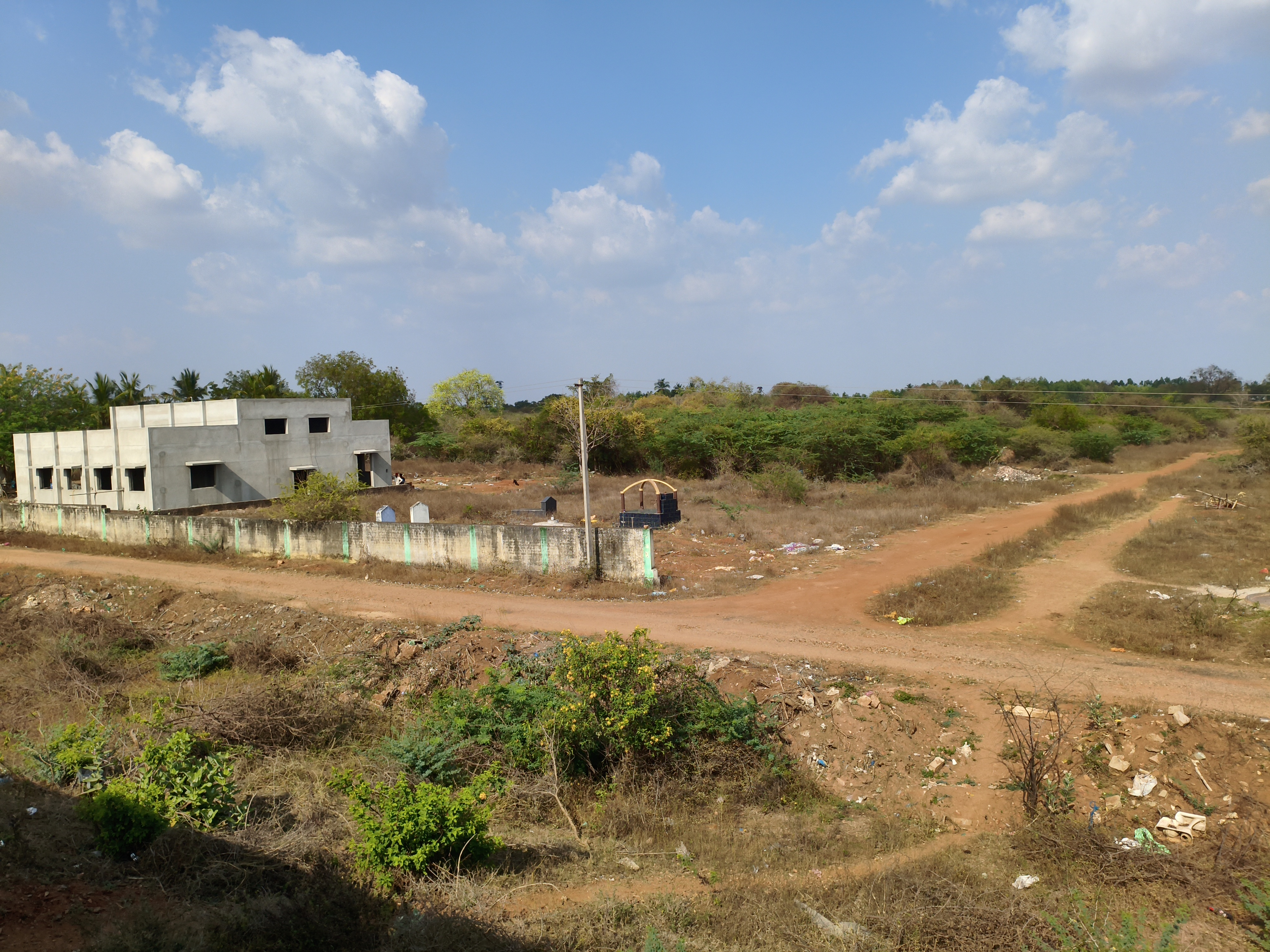
Keeranur

== Demographics ==
As of 2001 India census, Keeranur had a population of 9681. Males constitute 51% of the population and females 49%. Keeranur has an average literacy rate of 76%, higher than the national average of 59.5%: male literacy is 82%, and female literacy is 70%. In Keeranur, 12% of the population is under 7 years of age.
