= Sendakkottai =

- village
- Country: India
- State: Tamil Nadu
- District: Thanjavur
- Taluk: Pattukkottai

Population (2001)
  - Total: 2,116

Languages
  - Official: Tamil
- Time zone: UTC+5:30 (IST)

Sendakkottai is a village in the Pattukkottai taluk of Thanjavur district, Tamil Nadu, India.

== Demographics ==
As per the 2001 census, Sendakkottai had a total population of 2116 with 1014 males and 1102 females. The sex ratio was 1087. The literacy rate was 74.89.

== Economy ==
The region produces rice, bananas, sugarcane, groundnuts, and coconuts, which are exported to other Indian states. Crops like cocoa, corn, and sunflowers are also cultivated. Some farmers have shifted to coconut plantations, leading to reduced rice cultivation and increased prices for edible crops. Sugarcane remains a significant crop due to its profitability and the availability of abundant groundwater. The village produces large quantities of cow and buffalo milk, distributed to nearby areas. However, the lack of pastoral land has led many residents to rely on packaged milk. During summer, when lakes dry up, the local economy shifts toward selling fresh fish and crabs. Temperatures often reach 45°C, and most homes are roofed with woven coconut leaves, crafted by the elderly.
