= Washington Savings Bank (New York City) =

Defunct New York City bank

The Washington Savings Bank was a New York City bank founded on April 22, 1897 and closed by New York State banking regulators on December 29, 1910 when bank President Joseph G. Robonovitch was indicted for grand larceny for stealing $90,000. Much excitement surrounded the morphine-addicted Robin's arraignment when he tried to commit suicide by taking poison. Four other bank officials were indicted for perjury for making false statements to bank regulators.
