= List of shipwrecks in 1909 =

List of shipwrecks in 1909 includes ships sunk, foundered, grounded, or otherwise lost during 1909.

table of contents
1909
Jan	Feb	Mar	Apr
May	Jun	Jul	Aug
Sep	Oct	Nov	Dec
Unknown date

== January ==
=== 2 January ===
List of shipwrecks: 2 January 1909
Ship	State	Description
Tam O'Shanter	United States	The tugboat struck a sunken obstruction in Tonawanda Creek and was beached at Tonawanda, New York.

=== 5 January ===
List of shipwrecks: 5 January 1909
Ship	State	Description
Anglo-African	United Kingdom	The 4,186 GRT steamer on a passage from Tocopilla, Chile for Baltimore, Maryland with a cargo of 7,000 tons of nitrates ran aground around 21:30 in thick weather five miles (8.0 km) south of Cape Henry. Attempts were made to move the vessel, and salvage tugs were employed but unsuccessfully. On 8 January the ship developed a heavy list to port and was abandoned.
Chicago	United States	The steamer struck a snag and sank in the Arkansas River near Waddells Landing, Arkansas, a total loss.
Standard	United States	The launch struck a submerged object in the Mississippi River and was beached to prevent her from sinking.

=== 6 January ===
List of shipwrecks: 6 January 1909
Ship	State	Description
Eugenia A. Eley	United States	The 5-gross register ton sloop capsized in the Chesapeake Bay with the loss of two lives. There were two survivors.

=== 8 January ===
List of shipwrecks: 8 January 1909
Ship	State	Description
J. A. Towns	United States	The 82-gross register ton sternwheel paddle steamer was lost when she struck a snag in the Yazoo River in Mississippi. Two of the 20 people on board lost their lives.

=== 11 January ===
List of shipwrecks: 11 January 1909
Ship	State	Description
B. Hersey	United States	The steamer, laid up for the winter, sank at Dubuque, Iowa. Later raised, repaired and returned to service before April.
Glendale	United Kingdom	The 1,000 GRT steamer on a passage from Bo'ness, Scotland for Hamburg, Germany with a cargo of 1,200 tons of coal ran aground shortly after 03:00 in thick weather 2.5 miles (4.0 km) north of Helgoland. Attempts were made to move the vessel, but rising water forced the crew to abandon the ship by about noon. The master visited the ship two days later and found her completely wrecked.
Wangard	Germany	The 4,222 GRT steamer on a passage from Tacoma, Washington to Europe with cargo of cereals ran aground at Punta Mogotes and was subsequently abandoned.

=== 12 January ===
List of shipwrecks: 12 January 1909
Ship	State	Description
Adeline Townsend	United States	The 231-gross register ton schooner was lost in a collision with the screw steamer Mohican (United States) off Cape Henlopen, Delaware, with the loss of all six people on board.
Sibyl Marston	United States	The wreck of Sibyl Marston in 2010. The 1,086-gross register ton wooden screw steam schooner was wrecked during a storm near Surf, California, with the loss of two crewmen. There were 21 survivors.
Virginia F. Hawley	United States	The steamer sheared into the bank of the Dismal Swamp Canal and was holed and sunk. She was abandoned after salvage of her machinery.

=== 15 January ===
List of shipwrecks: 15 January 1909
Ship	State	Description
Dave Wood	United States	The steamer struck an obstruction and sank in 12 feet (3.7 m) of water in the Ohio River at Lock No. 4. Raised and laid up.
Fidra	United Kingdom	The 1,218 GRT steamer on a passage from Burntisland for Rendsburg, Germany with a cargo of coal ran aground at Jungnamensand, Amrum and subsequently broke up with the loss of her entire crew.

=== 17 January ===
List of shipwrecks: 17 January 1909
Ship	State	Description
Number Twenty-Two	United States	The 936-gross register ton schooner barge foundered off Barnegat, New Jersey, with the loss of all five people on board.
Willie	United States	The tug sank at dock at Pier 75, North Philadelphia, Pennsylvania. Raised the next day.

=== 19 January ===
List of shipwrecks: 19 January 1909
Ship	State	Description
T. L. Morse	United States	The steamer was destroyed by fire at a shipyard in Berwick, Louisiana.

=== 20 January ===
List of shipwrecks: 20 January 1909
Ship	State	Description
Adato	United Kingdom	The 3,347 GRT steamer on a passage from Seattle for Hong Kong with a cargo consisting of 2,400 bales of cotton, 3,500 packages of general cargo, and 99,000 bags of flour went ashore on Oshima after leaving Yokohama for Kobe and subsequently sunk.
Bengar	United Kingdom	The 2,531 GRT steamer on a passage from Huelva for Garston with a cargo of 3,300 tons of ore ran ashore on a bank outside the entrance to Garston Old Dock. Attempts to tow the ship off failed and about 02:00 on 21 January the vessel broke down abaft the engine-room with both ends filling with water.

=== 21 January ===
List of shipwrecks: 21 January 1909
Ship	State	Description
Ensign	United States	The 618-gross register ton schooner was stranded at Naples, California. All 10 people on board survived.

=== 22 January ===
List of shipwrecks: 22 January 1909
Ship	State	Description
Anton Wilbert	United States	The steamer, while tied up opposite Franklin, Louisiana, caught fire when the watchman's lantern exploded and burned to the waterline.
Frances	United States	With no one on board, the 10-gross register ton motor vessel was stranded at Los Angeles, California.
Sadie Downman	United States	The steamer sprung a leak and sank in Six-Mile Lake, Louisiana at the end of Cypress Pass Island. The vessel was later raised.

=== 23 January ===
List of shipwrecks: 23 January 1909
Ship	State	Description
Nantucket	United States	The steamer ran aground on Nobska Point at the entrance to Woods Hole, Massachusetts in dense fog piercing a hole in her hull and filled with water to below the main deck. Raised, repaired and returned to service.
RMS Republic	United Kingdom	RMS Republic sinking The 15,000-gross register ton White Star Line ocean liner collided in fog with the ocean liner Florida (Italy) in the Atlantic Ocean south of Nantucket, Massachusetts. Aboard Republic, the impact killed two passengers, and two passengers died later of injuries, and three members of Florida's crew were killed when her bow was crushed in. Republic sank in 240 to 270 feet (73 to 82 m) of water 50 nautical miles (93 km; 58 mi) south of Nantucket at 40°26′00″N 069°46′00″W on 24 January. Florida and the revenue cutter USRC Gresham (United States Revenue Cutter Service) rescued over 1,500 survivors from Republic.

=== 24 January ===
List of shipwrecks: 24 January 1909
Ship	State	Description
Elizabeth Silsbee	United States	The 153-gross register ton motor vessel was stranded at Blanche Point on the coast of Nova Scotia, Canada. All 25 people on board survived.

=== 25 January ===
List of shipwrecks: 25 January 1909
Ship	State	Description
Alnmere	United Kingdom	The 3,252 GRT steamer on a passage from Baltimore to Veracruz with a cargo of 4,450 tons of coal and coke ran aground on the reefs off the western end of Pensacola Cay, Little Abaco, Bahamas around 23:20 while travelling at about 8 knots (15 km/h; 9.2 mph). The crew tried to save the ship but the storms that developed soon after forced them to abandon the vessel on 1 February as she began breaking up.
William C. Tanner	United States	The 1,033-gross register ton schooner departed Rockport, Massachusetts, bound for Key West, Florida, with ten people on board and was never heard from again.

=== 26 January ===
List of shipwrecks: 26 January 1909
Ship	State	Description
Buck	United States	The 29-gross register ton screw steamer foundered at dock at Charleston, South Carolina. All eight people on board survived.
Mjølner	Norway	The 1,687 GRT cargo ship while on a passage from North Shields to Naples with a cargo of coal and coke struck a rock and went aground off Burhou, Alderney Channel Islands at around 02:00 and was subsequently wrecked.
No Wonder	United States	The steamer was damaged in a collision with T. J. Potter (United States) in the Willamette River near Gillihan, Oregon and was beached in sinking condition.

=== 27 January ===
List of shipwrecks: 27 January 1909
Ship	State	Description
Yip	United States	With no one on board, the 8-gross register ton scow was stranded at White Rock, British Columbia, Canada.

=== 28 January ===
List of shipwrecks: 28 January 1909
Ship	State	Description
Golden Ball	United States	The 291-gross register ton schooner was stranded at Jonesport, Maine. All six people on board survived.
Hays	United States	With no one on board, the 10-gross register ton sternwheel motor paddle vessel was stranded in the Mississippi River at New Madrid, Missouri.
P. E. Wharton	United States	The 76-gross register ton schooner was stranded at North Beach, Maryland. All five people on board survived.
Sailor Boy	United States	The 14-gross register ton motor vessel burned on the Ohio River at Tell City, Indiana. Both people on board survived.

=== 30 January ===
List of shipwrecks: 30 January 1909
Ship	State	Description
Helena	United States	The 619-gross register ton schooner was stranded at Scituate, Massachusetts. All eight people on board survived.

=== 31 January ===
List of shipwrecks: 15 January 1909
Ship	State	Description
Clan Ranald	United Kingdom	The 3,596 GRT steamer on a passage from Adelaide for South Africa via Albany with a cargo of wheat and flour while passing by Troubridge suddenly developed a list to starboard at about 14:00. In rough seas many of the ship's lifeboats were destroyed and at about 22:00 the ship foundered and sank in approximately 700 feet (210 m) of water. Out of crew of 64, only the first officer, 3 whites and 20 Lascars were saved.
Mary Sanford	United States	The 479-gross register ton schooner was abandoned in the Atlantic Ocean at 38°N 65°W. All seven people on board survived.

=== Unknown date ===
List of shipwrecks: Unknown date 1909
Ship	State	Description
Pendeen	United Kingdom	The fishing vessel was lost in a gale. A search by the St Ives Lifeboat found no wreckage.

== February ==
=== 1 February ===
List of shipwrecks: 1 February 1909
Ship	State	Description
Horace P. Shares	United States	The 413-gross register ton schooner was abandoned in the Atlantic Ocean east of North Carolina at 35°32′N 073°48′W. All six people on board survived.

=== 2 February ===
List of shipwrecks: 2 February 1909
Ship	State	Description
Milton S. Lankford	United States	The bugeye was sunk in a collision with Columbia (United States) in the Norfolk, Virginia Channel.
Sun	United States	With no one on board, the 84-gross register ton sternwheel paddle steamer was stranded at Appalachicola, Florida.

=== 4 February ===
List of shipwrecks: 4 February 1909
Ship	State	Description
Belle O'Neill	United States	The 467-gross register ton schooner foundered on the Cape Lookout shoals off the coast of North Carolina. All eight people on board survived.
Lobito	Portugal	The passenger-cargo ship sank at Ilha do Maio in the Cape Verde Islands while on passage from São Vicente for Cape Verde.

=== 5 February ===
List of shipwrecks: 5 February 1909
Ship	State	Description
C. H. Tucker	United States	The 227-gross register ton canal boat was lost in a collision with an unnamed dredge in Hell Gate in New York City. The only person on board survived.

=== 8 February ===
List of shipwrecks: 8 February 1909
Ship	State	Description
Elvira Ball	United States	The 869-gross register ton schooner was abandoned in the Atlantic Ocean 130 nautical miles (240 km; 150 mi) east of Cape Charles, Virginia. All nine people on board survived.

=== 9 February ===
List of shipwrecks: 9 February 1909
Ship	State	Description
Ocean View	United States	The steamer was destroyed by fire at dock in Norfolk, Virginia. Three burned to death.

=== 10 February ===
List of shipwrecks: 10 February 1909
Ship	State	Description
Georgia	United States	The 350-gross register ton schooner was stranded on Munroe Island off the coast of Maine. All six people on board survived.
John A. Lingo	United States	The 36-gross register ton schooner foundered in Salem Cove on the coast of New Jersey. All four people on board survived.
Sarah W. Lawrence	United States	The 1,369-gross register ton schooner was stranded on Hen and Chicken Shoal, Cape Henlopen on the coast of Delaware. All nine people on board rescued by the United States Life Saving Service.

=== 12 February ===
List of shipwrecks: 12 February 1909
Ship	State	Description
Penguin	New Zealand	The inter-island steam ferry struck Toms Rock in the Cook Strait and sank off New Zealand's Cape Terawhiti near the entrance to Wellington Harbour with the loss of 85 passengers and crew. Thirty survivors.
Australia	Belgium	The steamer collided with a sailing ship and sank in the Mediterranean Sea off Alborán Island.

=== 13 February ===
List of shipwrecks: 13 February 1909
Ship	State	Description
Forest Castle	United Kingdom	The 2,788 GRT steamer on a passage from Bilbao to Rotterdam with a cargo of 4,600 tons of iron ore struck the La Vandrée rock in heavy weather around 15:30 and sank. Seven of her 24-men crew, including the ship's master, three engineers, and second officer, and 2 stowaways drowned in the incident.

=== 14 February ===
List of shipwrecks: 14 February 1909
Ship	State	Description
Carlos French	United States	The inland barge, under tow by Resolute (United States), sprung a leak and sank in five fathoms (30 ft; 9.1 m) of water on Sarah's Ledge in Long Island Sound off the harbor of New London, Connecticut. The crew were rescued by Resolute. Raised, taken to New London and repaired.
Nugget	United States	After being blown out into the Gulf of Alaska off Cross Sound by a storm on 9 February during a voyage from Lituya Bay to Juneau, District of Alaska, the sloop was abandoned 75 nautical miles (139 km; 86 mi) off Cape Fairweather (58°48′30″N 137°56′45″W) after a second storm struck and destroyed her sails and rigging. The steamer Northwestern (United States) rescued seven crewmen.
Thomas Edwin	United Kingdom	The ketch, on a voyage to Falmouth, Cornwall with bricks and cement, collided with a cofferdam in tow of tug HERCULANEUM and foundered about 1 nautical mile (1.9 km; 1.2 mi) south-east of St Anthony Head. The crew of three were recued from the ship's boat by a pilot cutter. The wreck was blown up as a danger to navigation on the following day.

=== 15 February ===
List of shipwrecks: 15 February 1909
Ship	State	Description
Lady Mildred	Australia	The 2,180 GRT steamer on a passage from Newcastle to Melbourne with a cargo of coal ran ashore a few minutes after midnight in hazy weather on the eastern side of Wilsons Promontory Lighthouse. The vessel could not be salvaged and was abandoned.

=== 16 February ===
List of shipwrecks: 16 February 1909
Ship	State	Description
Clara	United States	The 9-gross register ton motor vessel burned at Liverpool, Florida. Both people on board survived.
We Three	United States	The 15-gross register ton sternwheel motor paddle vessel burned on the Green River at Spottsville, Kentucky. All six people on board survived.

=== 17 February ===
List of shipwrecks: 17 February 1909
Ship	State	Description
Miles M. Merry	United States	The 1,589-gross register ton schooner was stranded on the coast of Long Island at Moriches, New York. All 11 people on board survived.
Minnie Gorgas	United States	The steamer burned on Sweetbay Lake on the Atchafalaya River in Louisiana.

=== 19 February ===
List of shipwrecks: 19 February 1909
Ship	State	Description
Guide	United States	The steamer was beached in the Pasquotank River in North Carolina to avoid her being swamped during a gale.
HDMS Hejmdal	Royal Danish Navy	The cruiser suffered severe damage in a collision with the steamer Astrakhan (United Kingdom) off Helsingør, Denmark.
John H. Starin	United States	The 174-foot (53 m), 312-gross register ton sidewheel paddle steamer was blown onto a breakwater in the harbor at Bridgewater, Connecticut, during a storm. She later was hauled off the breakwater, repaired, and placed back in service.

=== 20 February ===
List of shipwrecks: 20 February 1909
Ship	State	Description
John H. Starin	United States	The steamer was wrecked and sank on a breakwater at Bridgeport, Connecticut in a storm.
Kansas City	United States	With no one on board, the 8-gross register ton sternwheel motor paddle vessel foundered off Cuivre Island, Missouri.
Rescue	United States	The tow steamer sank at dock at Pier 5 in the East River, after shipping water in stormy weather off The Battery and crossing the North River. Raised and repapired.

=== 21 February ===
List of shipwrecks: 21 February 1909
Ship	State	Description
P. Rasmussen, jr.	United States	The 15-gross register ton schooner was stranded in Smith Island Inlet, Virginia. Both people on board survived.

=== 22 February ===
List of shipwrecks: 22 February 1909
Ship	State	Description
Soquel	United States	The 767-gross register ton schooner was stranded in the Fraser River on Sea Bird Island in British Columbia in Canada with the loss of two lives. There were 12 survivors.
Urbanus Dart	United States	The tow steamer caught fire off Romer Shoals in the Harbor of New York City and was beached at Sandy Hook.

=== 23 February ===
List of shipwrecks: 23 February 1909
Ship	State	Description
Lydia	United States	With no one on board, the 8-gross register ton schooner foundered in Galveston Bay off High Island, Texas.

=== 24 February ===
List of shipwrecks: 24 February 1909
Ship	State	Description
Esther	United States	The 12-gross register ton motor vessel burned on the Osage River at Hoecker, Missouri. All five people on board survived.
F. C. Loxley	United States	The steamer sank at Car Point, Louisiana.

=== 26 February ===
List of shipwrecks: 26 February 1909
Ship	State	Description
Columbia	United States	The steamer sank in shallow water in the Mississippi River when she hit an obstruction while making a landing at Grand Levee, 9 miles (14 km) above Bayou Sara, Louisiana. The portion of the ship that remained above water then burned.
USRC Mohawk	United States Revenue Cutter Service	The United States Revenue cutter ran aground in Hell Gate on a ledge known as Hog Back. Refloated, repaired and returned to service.
S. E. Swayze	United States	The steamer burned at Jones Landing, Louisiana in the Boeuf River.
Venus	United States	The 21-gross register ton sloop was stranded at Truro, Massachusetts. All four people on board survived.

=== 27 February ===
List of shipwrecks: 27 February 1909
Ship	State	Description
Forrest Hall	United Kingdom	She was a 3-masted sailing ship, of 2,052 GT, built of iron, which ran ashore at 9.30am on Saturday, 27 February 1909, on Te Oneroa-a-Tōhē / Ninety Mile Beach, about 25 mi (40 km) south of Cape Maria Van Diemen, near Wakatehāua Island. No lives were lost. She was launched on 10 September 1883 by W.H. Potter & Sons, Liverpool and was en route from Newcastle to Antofagasta with coal. The captain's certificate was suspended for two years, and he had to pay the costs of the investigation. There were questions about insurance fraud and drunkenness. Comments were also made that the master had not given a satisfactory explanation and that this was "the first case heard of by seafaring men of a boat going ashore in fine weather, daylight, and on a weather coast". Although the wreck was on a remote coast, a local firm of photographers, the Northwood Brothers, postponed a talk they were due to give and took many pictures of the wreck.

=== 28 February ===
List of shipwrecks: 28 February 1909
Ship	State	Description
Queen City No. 2	United States	With no one on board, the 46-gross register ton scow was stranded in Eagle Harbor on Bainbridge Island in Washington.

== March ==
=== 1 March ===
List of shipwrecks: 1 March 1909
Ship	State	Description
William Chestnut	United States	The 19-gross register ton schooner was stranded on the Sturgeon Bar in the Rappahannock River in Virginia. Both people on board survived.

=== 3 March ===
List of shipwrecks: 3 March 1909
Ship	State	Description
Calhoun	United States	The steamer struck a log sticking out from the bank and sank in the Chipola River. The ship's cook died.
Mary Washington or Martha Washington	United States	The 27-gross register ton motor vessel was stranded at Sewell's Point in Norfolk, Virginia after parting her anchor line, a total loss. The only person on board survived.

=== 4 March ===
List of shipwrecks: 4 March 1909
Ship	State	Description
Plymouth	United States	The steamer sank at Henderson's Wharf at the foot of Fells Street, Baltimore, Maryland.

=== 5 March ===
List of shipwrecks: 5 March 1909
Ship	State	Description
Glenmore	United States	The 208-gross register ton sternwheel paddle steamer was undergoing repairs on a marine railway at Harlem, Missouri when a sudden rise in the river flooded the Yard, launching the vessel into the river where she sank, a total loss. All eight people on board survived.
Queen of Decatur	United States	The 24-gross register ton sternwheel motor paddle vessel was "cut down by ice' on the Missouri River at Decatur, Nebraska. Both people on board survived.

=== 6 March ===
List of shipwrecks: 6 March 1909
Ship	State	Description
Uncle Tom	United States	The steamer sank while lying on the bank at St. Louis, a total loss.

=== 8 March ===
List of shipwrecks: 8 March 1909
Ship	State	Description
Emma Marie	United States	The steamer burned to the waterline and sank in the Great Kanawha River at Henderson, West Virginia.
J. M. Bowell	United States	The steamer burned to the waterline and sank in the Great Kanawha River at Henderson, West Virginia.
Kawailani	United States	The 24-gross register ton schooner was stranded on the coast of Oahu in the Territory of Hawaii with the loss of one life. There were three survivors.

=== 10 March ===
List of shipwrecks: 10 March 1909
Ship	State	Description
Horatio Hall	United States	The 3,167-gross register ton steel-hulled cargo liner sank in 35 feet (11 m) of water after a collision with the cargo ship H. F. Dimock (United States) at Pollock Rip Shoal 3 nautical miles (5.6 km; 3.5 mi) east of Chatham, Massachusetts. All 63 people on board survived.
Ladysmith	Canada	The Barkentine ran aground on Fishers Island, New York.
Massachusetts	United States	The steamer ran aground on Cedar Tree Neck, Martha's Vineyard, Massachusetts.

=== 11 March ===
List of shipwrecks: 11 March 1909
Ship	State	Description
Love Point	United States	The 618-gross register ton iron-hulled sidewheel paddle steamer burned in the Chesapeake Bay off Love Point on Kent Island in Maryland. All 22 people on board survived.

=== 12 March ===
List of shipwrecks: 12 March 1909
Ship	State	Description
Fred A. Small	United States	The 619-gross register ton schooner was stranded on the Nantucket Shoals off the coast of Massachusetts. All eight people on board survived.
Michigan	United States	The 450-ton barge sank in the Tanana River in the District of Alaska.

=== 15 March ===
List of shipwrecks: 15 March 1909
Ship	State	Description
Tarboro	United States	The steamer struck a snag and sank in the Tar River.

=== 20 March ===
List of shipwrecks: 20 March 1909
Ship	State	Description
R. D. Inman	United States	The 768-gross register ton screw steamer was stranded on Duxbury Reef off the coast of California, a total loss. All 22 people on board survived.

=== 21 March ===
List of shipwrecks: 21 March 1909
Ship	State	Description
Hathor	United Kingdom	The 2,828 GRT cargo ship departed Rio de Janeiro for Santos on 20 March and ran ashore next day at Boi Point, near San Sebastian. She became stranded and soon was abandoned.
Joseph B. Thomas	United States	The 1,564-gross register ton schooner was stranded on the Fowey Rocks on Key Biscayne, Florida. All 11 people on board survived.
Massasoit	United States	The steamer caught fire at dock in Boston due to an exploding lamp. She was scuttled to put out the fire. Raised, repaired and returned to service.

=== 22 March ===
List of shipwrecks: 22 March 1909
Ship	State	Description
Clay Forman	United States	The steamer struck an obstruction and sank in the Pasquotank River.

=== 23 March ===
List of shipwrecks: 23 March 1909
Ship	State	Description
Marconi	United States	The 693-gross register ton schooner was stranded on the bar in Coos Bay on the coast of Oregon. All 10 people on board survived.

=== 24 March ===
List of shipwrecks: 24 March 1909
Ship	State	Description
Wanderer	United States	The 84-gross register ton sternwheel paddle steamer, or tow steamer foundered in Florida Bay off Money Key in the Florida Keys in 8 feet of water sitting on an even keel. All 18 people on board rescued by Columbia (United States).

=== 25 March ===
List of shipwrecks: 25 March 1909
Ship	State	Description
Cleopatra	United States	The 13-gross register ton motor vessel was stranded on St. George Island on the coast of Florida. Both people on board lost their lives.
Pomona	United States	The steamer struck rocks in heavy fog off Milwaukie, Oregon and sank.
Samar	United States	The 1,082-gross register ton schooner barge, under tow of Prudence (United States), sprung a leak in a gale and foundered in 17 fathoms (102 ft; 31 m) of water 8 miles (13 km) south south east of Highlands, New Jersey. All four people on board rescued by Prudence.
Spotsville	United States	The steamer sank due to negligence and inattention to duty by her officers at the levee at Evansville, Indiana on the Ohio River.
Vulcan	United Kingdom	The steamer foundered one mile (1.6 km) south west of the Middle Buoy, off Haisborough Sands.

=== 26 March ===
List of shipwrecks: 26 March 1909
Ship	State	Description
Hiram Lowell	United States	The schooner ran aground on rocks off New London, Connecticut.

=== 29 March ===
List of shipwrecks: 29 March 1909
Ship	State	Description
C. P. Raymond	United States	The tow steamer sprung a leak and sank at dock over night at the foot of Pacific Street, Brooklyn. Raised and repaired.
Ilorin	United Kingdom	The 946 GRT Elder Dempster cargo ship ran aground and sank on the bar at Forçados River, Nigeria while attempting to assist Andoni.
Kittle Lawry	United States	The 33-gross register ton schooner was stranded in the White Islands in Penobscot Bay off the coast of Maine. Both people on board survived.

=== 31 March ===
List of shipwrecks: 31 March 1909
Ship	State	Description
Charles E. Falk	United States	The 298-gross register ton schooner was stranded on the Cohalis Rocks off the coast of Washington. All eight people on board survived.

=== Unknown date ===
List of shipwrecks: Unknown date 1909
Ship	State	Description
Sea Bird	United States	The tug was wrecked off Ketchikan, District of Alaska.

== April ==
=== 3 April ===
List of shipwrecks: 3 April 1909
Ship	State	Description
Admiral	United States	The steamer collieded with the Chicago, St. Paul, Minneapolis and Omaha Railway bridge in St. Paul, Minnesota and sank.
Indiana	United States	The 3,335-gross register ton iron-hulled screw steamer was stranded at Cape Tosco on Santa Margarita Island, Mexico, in thick fog, a total loss. Cargo partially salvaged. All 82 people on board rescued by USS Albany(United States Navy).

=== 6 April ===
List of shipwrecks: 6 April 1909
Ship	State	Description
HMS Blackwater	Royal Navy	The Laird-type River-class destroyer sank in the English Channel off Dungeness, England, at position 50°55′21″N 1°6′10″E after colliding with the merchant ship Hero (flag unknown).
Emerald	United States	The steamer was sunk in a collision with Glenville (United States) in thick fog one-half mile (0.80 km) east of Throgs Point Buoy. The crew were rescued by Glenville.
Leo	United States	The tug struck an obstruction and sank in 30 feet (9.1 m) of water at Algiers, Louisiana. Raised and repaired.

=== 7 April ===
List of shipwrecks: 7 April 1909
Ship	State	Description
Beacon	United States	The 341-gross register ton barge foundered off Watch Hill, Rhode Island. Both people on board survived.
Beaver	United States	The 314-gross register ton sternwheel paddle steamer burned at Cairo, Illinois while tied up alongside Geo. Gardner (United States), with the loss of one life. There were 24 survivors.
Cubana	United States	The steamer was damaged in a collision with Havana (United States) while anchored in fog at Quarantine, New York. She was run aground on a mud bank off Clifton, New Jersey as a precaution.
Geo. Gardner	United States	The 72-gross register ton sternwheel paddle steamer burned at Cairo, Illinois while tied up alongside Beaver (United States). The only person on board survived.
J. J. H. Brown	United States	The steamer dragged anchor in a severe gale and went ashore at Buffalo, New York. Refloated same day by tugs.
Slatington	United States	The tow steamer shipped water in rough weather, sinking after arrival at her dock at Pier 41, Brooklyn, New York. Raised and repaired.
William H. Truesdale	United States	The steamer dragged anchor in a severe gale and went ashore at Buffalo, New York. Refloated on 13 April.

=== 8 April ===
List of shipwrecks: 8 April 1909
Ship	State	Description
Beacon	United States	The inland barge, under tow by John Scully (United States), sank in Block Island Sound after breaking loose from R. M. Waterman (United States) during a gale the night before. No casualties.
Dagenham	United Kingdom	The 1,466 GRT British cargo steamer built in 1907 by John Crown & Sons for Furness, Withy & Co. On 18 April 1909, when northwest Grunes, Cobo Bay, Guernsey Channel Islands, she ran aground and was wrecked while on a voyage from the Tyne to Saint-Malo with a cargo of coal.
Geo. A. Floss	United States	The fishing steamer sank off Cleveland, Ohio in a heavy gale and lost with all seven crew. Raised later.
Mahratta	United Kingdom	Mahratta broken in half. The passenger-cargo ship was wrecked on Goodwin Sands in the English Channel off Kent, England, and broke in half two days later. One crew member committed suicide.

=== 9 April ===
List of shipwrecks: 9 April 1909
Ship	State	Description
Hetty Agnes	United States	The launch sprang a leak, capsized and sank in Boston harbor. The crew abandoned ship in her boat, but it was capsized when the ship capsized. Her captain died of exposure.

=== 12 April ===
List of shipwrecks: 12 April 1909
Ship	State	Description
Emmett Small	United States	The steamer struck a snag and sank in the Ocmulgee River 24 miles (39 km) east of Macon, Georgia, a total loss.

=== 13 April ===
List of shipwrecks: 13 April 1909
Ship	State	Description
Albany	United States	The barge, being towed by North America (United States), was sunk in a collision with Manhattan (United States) in Long Island Sound off New Haven, Connecticut. The crew were rescued by another barge in the tow.
Honora Butler	United States	The schooner was damaged in a collision with tow steamer Manuet in the East River off Corlears Hook. She was towed to Tenth Street, New York City, where she sank.
Virginia	United States	The steamer struck a rock in the Ohio River at Wellsville, Ohio and was beached. Filled and sank the next morning.

=== 14 April ===
List of shipwrecks: 14 April 1909
Ship	State	Description
Emmette Small	United States	The steamer struck a snag and sank 12–15 miles (19–24 km) below Macon, Georgia.
James C. Clifford	United States	The 377-gross register ton schooner was abandoned in the Gulf of Mexico 60 nautical miles (110 km; 69 mi) southeast of Pensacola, Florida. All seven people on board survived.

=== 15 April ===
List of shipwrecks: 15 April 1909
Ship	State	Description
Daisy	United States	The tug was destroyed by fire at Lorain, Ohio.
Fred B. Hall	United States	The steamer was sunk by ice while moored off Susie Island in Lake Superior. Later raised.
G. A. Hayden	United States	The 107-gross register ton schooner was stranded at Point Judith, Rhode Island. All four people on board survived.
Kimball	United States	The steamer struck an obstruction and sank in 30 feet (9.1 m) of water at the junction of the Mobile River and the Tensas River. Raised and repaired.

=== 16 April ===
List of shipwrecks: 16 April 1909
Ship	State	Description
Hampton	United States	The steamer was destroyed by fire on Smith & McCoy's Railway, Norfolk, Virginia.

=== 17 April ===
List of shipwrecks: 17 April 1909
Ship	State	Description
La Fayette	United States	With no one on board, the 26-gross register ton schooner foundered in the St. Johns River in Delaware.

=== 18 April ===
List of shipwrecks: 18 April 1909
Ship	State	Description
E. A. Shores	United States	The sand sucker dredge sprung a leak and was beached on Stag Island in the St. Clair River. The crew escaped in her yawl.
Gen. H. M. Robert	United States	The US Army Corps of Engineers dredge burned in Texas.

=== 19 April ===
List of shipwrecks: 19 April 1909
Ship	State	Description
Eber Ward	United States	The 1,343-gross register ton screw steamer, a cargo ship, was sunk by ice in the Strait of Mackinac with the loss of five crew. There were 11 survivors.

=== 21 April ===
List of shipwrecks: 21 April 1909
Ship	State	Description
Samuel Eccles, Jr.	United States	The steamer sank at dock at Norfolk, Virginia.

=== 22 April ===
List of shipwrecks: 22 April 1909
Ship	State	Description
Lillie	United States	The 11-gross register ton motor vessel was lost when she struck a pile at Long Branch, New Jersey. Both people on board survived.
Rebecca W. Huddell	United States	The 256-gross register ton schooner was stranded on East Libbey Island on the coast of Maine. All six people on board survived.
Wm. H. Conner or William H. Conner	United States	The 1,514-gross register ton schooner barge ran aground and filled with water after a collision with the barge A.G. Ropes, also being towed by tow steamer M. E. Luckenbach (United States), with the schooner Hugh Kelly (United States) in the ship channel of the Harbor of New York City causing her tow line to be cast off. Crew rescued by M. E. Luckenbach.

=== 25 April ===
List of shipwrecks: 25 April 1909
Ship	State	Description
Eagle	United States	The 185-gross register ton sternwheel tow paddle steamer capsized off Point Celeste, Louisiana, 41 miles (66 km) below New Orleans, with the loss of her master, six crewmen and a female chamber maid. There were eight survivors.

=== 26 April ===
List of shipwrecks: 26 April 1909
Ship	State	Description
Foca	Italian Royal Navy	The Foca-class submarine was scuttled in the harbor at Naples, Italy, to extinguish a fuel fire that resulted from an internal gasoline explosion. She was refloated, repaired, and returned to service.
Roderick Dhu	United States	The 1,534-gross register ton iron-hulled oil schooner was stranded at Point Pinos, Monterey Bay California. Abandoned after a number of failed salvage attempts. All 12 people on board survived.

=== 29 April ===
List of shipwrecks: 29 April 1909
Ship	State	Description
Aurania	United States	The 3,218-gross register ton steel-hulled screw steamer sprang a leak working through ice and foundered in 50 fathoms of water in Whitefish Bay, Michigan. All 20 people on board used her lifeboat to get to Bartow (flag unknown).

=== 30 April ===
List of shipwrecks: 30 April 1909
Ship	State	Description
Columbia	United States	During a voyage from San Francisco, California, to Bristol Bay on the coast of the District of Alaska carrying passengers and a cargo of cannery supplies, the 1,327-ton or 1,471-gross register ton (sources disagree), 205.9-foot (62.8 m) full-rigged ship was wrecked near Seal Cape (54°23′30″N 164°38′30″W) in Unimak Bay on the coast of Unimak Island in the Aleutian Islands during a snowstorm. Sources disagree on whether 193 people or 194 people – 170 passengers and 24 crewmen – were on board, but agree that all on board survived. Columbia became a total loss.
George Nester	United States	The 790-gross register ton schooner was stranded on Huron Island of the coast off Michigan with the loss of all seven people on board.
Russia	United States	The 1,501-gross register ton iron-hulled screw steamer foundered due to cargo shifting 12 miles (19 km) south south east of Point Detour, Michigan. All 20 people on board made it to shore in lifeboats.

== May ==
=== 1 May ===
List of shipwrecks: 1 May 1909
Ship	State	Description
Adella Shores	United States	The 734-gross register ton screw steamer foundered in Lake Superior off Grand Island, Michigan, with the loss of all 14 people on board. Found 112 years later 40 miles northwest of Whitefish Point in over 650 feet of water.
William C. Carnegie	United States	The 2,663-gross register ton schooner was stranded at Moriches, Long Island, New York. All 13 people on board survived.

=== 2 May ===
List of shipwrecks: 1 May 1909
Ship	State	Description
St. Lucie	United States	The steamer struck an obstruction and sank in ten feet (3.0 m) of water in Sawyer's Key Channel, Florida. Ship was raised.

=== 3 May ===
List of shipwrecks: 3 May 1909
Ship	State	Description
Alice	United States	The barge, being towed by Hokendaqua (United States), foundered in strong wind off the Branford, Connecticut Beacon.
Anthracite	United States	The barge went ashore on Falkner Island, Connecticut.
Florence	United States	The barge, being towed by Hokendaqua (United States), foundered in strong wind off the Branford, Connecticut Beacon.
Moosic	United States	The barge went ashore on Falkner Island, Connecticut.
Susquehana	United States	The barge, being towed by C. B. Sandford (United States), broke loose from her tow in strong wind off Goose Island in Long Island Sound and went ashore. Her captain, his wife and son, and one crewman died trying to get to shore.
Unidentified barge	United States	The barge, being towed by Resolute (United States), foundered in strong wind off the Branford, Connecticut Beacon after loosing her towline.
Unidentified barge	United States	The barge, being towed by C. B. Sandford (United States), broke loose from her tow in strong wind off Goose Island in Long Island Sound and went ashore.
Unidentified scows	United States	Three scows, being towed by Resolute (United States), broke loose from their tow in strong wind off the Branford, Connecticut Beacon and went ashore.

=== 5 May ===
List of shipwrecks: 5 May 1909
Ship	State	Description
Dorothy	United States	The schooner was sunk in a collision in thick fog with City of Bangor (United States) in Muscle Ridge Channel, Maine. The crew were rescued by City of Bangor.
Illeri	Norway	The brig collided with the Ve Skerries, Shetland in thick fog.

=== 7 May ===
List of shipwrecks: 7 May 1909
Ship	State	Description
Nunivak	United States	The 681-gross register ton, 180-foot (54.9 m) sternwheel paddle steamer was wrecked on the Tanana River at Nenana, District of Alaska. All seven people on board survived.

=== 10 May ===
List of shipwrecks: 10 May 1909
Ship	State	Description
Jerry	United States	The motor vessel sprung a leak in the Gulf of Mexico and was abandoned in sinking condition 50 miles (80 km) south of the Ship Shoal Light.

=== 14 May ===
List of shipwrecks: 14 May 1909
Ship	State	Description
S. O. Co. No. 91	United States	The barge, under tow of Maverick (United States), struck the bar entering the Columbia River and was anchored four miles (6.4 km) below Astoria, Oregon for the night. Over night she sank in 7 fathoms (42 ft; 13 m) of water. The vessel was raised three weeks later.

=== 18 May ===
List of shipwrecks: 18 May 1909
Ship	State	Description
Clifton	United States	The 256-gross register ton sidewheel paddle steamer was stranded five miles (8.0 km) north of Beaufort, South Carolina and broke up, a total loss. All 16 people on board survived.
Jennie French Potter	United States	Carrying a cargo of coal, the 258-foot (79 m), 1,993-gross register ton five-masted schooner was wrecked on Halfmoon Shoal in Nantucket Sound off the coast of Massachusetts at 41°28′28″N 070°16′38″W. All 11 people on board survived. Her wrecked settled in 20 feet (6.1 m) of water.
William G. Eadle	United States	The 46-gross register ton schooner was stranded in the harbor at Gouldsboro, Maine. Both people on board survived.

=== 19 May ===
List of shipwrecks: 19 May 1909
Ship	State	Description
Ina	United States	With no one on board, the 15-gross register ton scow foundered off Bellingham, Washington.

=== 20 May ===
List of shipwrecks: 20 May 1909
Ship	State	Description
Gertrude Riley	United States	The canal boat was pushed by the tide into Mill Rock in the East River near Ninety-Fourth Street, New York City, causing her to sink.

=== 21 May ===
List of shipwrecks: 21 May 1909
Ship	State	Description
Harry Lynds	United States	The steamer struck a stump and sank in the Missouri River at White Cloud, Kansas, a total loss.

=== 24 May ===
List of shipwrecks: 24 May 1909
Ship	State	Description
Princeton	United States	The tug, while passing lines to Western States (United States), was rammed by Western States causing her to roll over and sink at Buffalo, New York. Three crewmen were killed.

=== 26 May ===
List of shipwrecks: 26 May 1909
Ship	State	Description
James H. Robinson	United States	With no one on board, the 97-gross register ton canal boat foundered off Brooklyn, New York.
London	United States	The 8-gross register ton motor vessel foundered off Galveston, Texas. The only person on board survived.

=== 27 May ===
List of shipwrecks: 27 May 1909
Ship	State	Description
E. J. Earling	United States	The steamer stranded in dense fog on Madeline Island in Lake Superior. Later pulled off and repaired.

=== 29 May ===
List of shipwrecks: 13 May 1909
Ship	State	Description
Ann Arbor No. 4	United States	The train ferry capsized and sank at dock in Manistique, Michigan when a train got out of control while being loaded. Raised and back in service in five days.
Narara	Australia	The cargo steamer sprang a leak and sank in the Narrabeen Bight off Sydney, Australia, with no loss of life.

=== 30 May ===
List of shipwrecks: 30 May 1909
Ship	State	Description
F. M. Smith	United States	With no one on board, the 295-gross register ton sternwheel paddle steamer burned on the Alameda Flats in California.

=== 31 May ===
List of shipwrecks: 31 May 1909
Ship	State	Description
Harry M.	United States	The ferry yacht was sunk in a collision with Ruth (United States) in the Ohio River at Moundsville, West Virginia.

=== Unknown date ===
List of shipwrecks: Unknown date 1909
Ship	State	Description
Loango		The schooner was wrecked near St Ives, Cornwall, United Kingdom. Four crew rescued.

== June ==
=== 4 June ===
List of shipwrecks: 4 June 1909
Ship	State	Description
A. Gebhart	United States	The 354-gross register ton schooner burned off Drummond Island off the coast of Michigan. All six people on board survived.
Dan Kunz	United States	The steamer pounded bottom leaving a dock at Kirtland Street, Cleveland, Ohio causing a leak and she sank.
Iron Age	United States	The 1,114-gross register ton screw steamer burned to the waterline and sank in the Shipping Channel ten miles (16 km) below Bar Point, Ontario and three miles (4.8 km) east of Detroit River Light. The wreck was later blown up as a hazard to navigation. All ten people on board survived.

=== 6 June ===
List of shipwrecks: 6 June 1909
Ship	State	Description
Lilly Amiot	United States	The 14-gross register ton motor vessel exploded and burned at Ellison Bay, Wisconsin. All three people on board survived.

=== 8 June ===
List of shipwrecks: 8 June 1909
Ship	State	Description
Clifton	United States	The tow steamer was destroyed by fire over night in the Allegheny River at Pittsburgh.

=== 9 June ===
List of shipwrecks: 9 June 1909
Ship	State	Description
Crescent City	United States	The steamer was damaged in the Canadian lock at Sault Ste. Marie, Ontario when the south lower Lock gate was destroyed when hit by Perry G. Walker (United States). The unleashed water drove Crescent City over the Miter Sills puncturing or tearing out her bottom plates. She made the government pier on the US side and sank.
Freeman	United States	The 1,197-gross register ton bark was stranded on Hicacos Island in Puerto Rico. All 16 people on board survived.
Sea Lion	United States	The 185-gross register ton iron-hulled screw steamer Tug was lost in a collision with the schooner Oceania Vance (United States) in dense fog at Race Rocks at the eastern entrance of the Strait of Juan de Fuca in the Salish Sea off British Columbia. All ten people on board crossed over to the schooner.

=== 11 June ===
List of shipwrecks: 11 June 1909
Ship	State	Description
RMS Slavonia	United Kingdom	The passenger ship ran aground at Punda dos Fenais, Flores, Azores, Portugal and was wrecked. All passengers were rescued by Prinzess Irene and Batavia (both Germany).

=== 12 June ===
List of shipwrecks: 12 June 1909
Ship	State	Description
Shearwater	United States	The passenger steamer sank off Pier 2, Philadelphia, Pennsylvania. One woman drowned.

=== 14 June ===
List of shipwrecks: 14 June 1909
Ship	State	Description
Arthur Binney	United States	The 118-gross register ton schooner was stranded on Cape Breton Island at Fourchu, Nova Scotia. All 18 people on board survived.

=== 15 June ===
List of shipwrecks: 15 June 1909
Ship	State	Description
Camilla A	United States	During a voyage in the District of Alaska from Cordova to St. Michael, the 322.96-ton scow was wrecked and sank in heavy seas in Chignik Bay (56°22′N 158°00′W) on the south coast of the Alaska Peninsula. Her crew of two survived, but she became a total loss.
Hattie M. Graham	United States	The 140-gross register ton schooner was stranded on Cape Breton Island at Bouline, Nova Scotia. All 17 people on board survived.
Madeira	United States	The tug was carried by the tide onto the bank in Mantua Creek causing her to roll over, fill and sink.

=== 17 June ===
List of shipwrecks: 17 June 1909
Ship	State	Description
Carrie	United States	The 10-gross register ton motor vessel burned at Charleston, South Carolina. All three people on board survived.
Gazette	United States	The steamer was destroyed by fire when a boiler tube burst ten miles (16 km) above Ford, Kentucky on the Kentucky River, a total loss.

=== 18 June ===
List of shipwrecks: 18 June 1909
Ship	State	Description
Hugh John	Canada	The schooner went ashore on Race Point, Fishers Island, New York. Returned to service.

=== 20 June ===
List of shipwrecks: 20 June 1909
Ship	State	Description
Louise	Belgium	The ship foundered 28 nautical miles (52 km) off Ventimiglia, Italy.

=== 21 June ===
List of shipwrecks: 21 June 1909
Ship	State	Description
Rambler	United States	The steamer was destroyed by fire while moored in Hampton Roads.

=== 22 June ===
List of shipwrecks: 22 June 1909
Ship	State	Description
Sonoma Valley	United States	The 37-gross register ton motor vessel burned and sank at Antioch, California. All three people on board survived.
W. P. Thew	United States	The 206-gross register ton screw steamer sank in 84 feet (26 m) of water in Lake Huron east of Thunder Bay Island off the coast of Michigan at 45.045083°N 83.153417°W after colliding with the screw steamer William Livingstone (United States). All 12 people on board abandoned ship in W. P. Thew′s yawl, from which the steamer Mary C. Elphicke (United States) rescued them.

=== 24 June ===
List of shipwrecks: 24 June 1909
Ship	State	Description
Scylla	Canada	The schooner went aground on Middle Ground near Martha's Vineyard, Massachusetts.

=== 25 June ===
List of shipwrecks: 25 June 1909
Ship	State	Description
Charles Hanson	United States	The motor vessel, or schooner, caught fire 30 miles (48 km) off Cleopatra Island, Mexico. The fire got out of hand and the crew abandoned ship in two lifeboats. Shortly after she was abandoned dynamite in her cargo detonated destroying the ship. The crew made it to Cleopatra Island where the ship's cook died there, the rest of the crew was rescued on 4 July by a Mexican launch.
Geo. R. Bailey	United States	The motor vessel was wrecked in thick fog at Pebble Beach, California, a total loss.
Jane	United States	The 26-gross register ton motor yacht burned at New Orleans, Louisiana. Both people on board survived.
Lord Londonderry	United Kingdom	The cargo ship, which had caught fire the day before, was abandoned 30 nautical miles (56 km) off Sines, Portugal. Her crew survived. She was on a voyage from Huelva, Spain, to Savannah, Georgia, United States.

=== 27 June ===
List of shipwrecks: 27 June 1909
Ship	State	Description
Bradwell	United States	The vessel, being towed by Fearless (United States), sank from waves breaking over her in Lake Borgne four miles (6.4 km) off New Orleans in nine feet (2.7 m) of water. She was raised.
Fearless	United States	The steamer struck a piling at the mouth of the Lake Borgne Canal and sank in seven feet (2.1 m) of water.

=== 28 June ===
List of shipwrecks: 28 June 1909
Ship	State	Description
Benj. C. Frith	United States	The 888-gross register ton schooner foundered on Martin Industry Shoal off the coast of South Carolina. All eight people on board survived.
Tempest	United States	The 369-gross register ton screw steamer burned off Parry Island in Parry Sound on the coast of Ontario. All 12 people on board survived.
Tempest	United States	The steamer burned off Parry Island in Prince William Sound, District of Alaska.

=== 30 June ===
List of shipwrecks: 30 June 1909
Ship	State	Description
Swatara	United States	The tug was sunk in a collision with Juan (Norway) in the Delaware River off Duck Creek gas buoy.

== July ==
=== 1 July ===
List of shipwrecks: 1 July 1909
Ship	State	Description
Alice E. Clark	United States	Carrying a cargo of coal, the 227-foot (69 m), 1,621-gross register ton four-masted schooner sank in 60 feet (18 m) of water in Penobscot Bay off Isleboro, Maine, at 44°21′00″N 068°51′24″W after striking Islesboro Ledge in fog.
Isleton	United States	The steamer caught fire at dock at Stockton, California. The fire got out of hand and she burned to the waterline and sank in eight feet (2.4 m) of water.
USS Nero	United States Navy	The collier ran aground on Brenton's Reef after leaving Newport, Rhode Island. Refloated 2 August and taken to Newport for temporary repairs before being towed to the Brooklyn Navy Yard 21–22 December for permanent repairs. Repaired and returned to service.

=== 2 July ===
List of shipwrecks: 2 July 1909
Ship	State	Description
Albert Hanson	United States	The steamer capsized in a storm on Grand Lake. One crewman killed.
John Schuette	United States	The schooner was sunk in a collision with Alfred Mitchell (United States), probably in the Detroit area.

=== 8 July ===
List of shipwrecks: 8 July 1909
Ship	State	Description
Norman	United States	The steamer was destroyed by fire while docked at Bayside, North Carolina.
Perkasie	United States	The barge, towed by Valley Forge (United States), sank nine miles (14 km) off Barnegat Lighthouse.

=== 9 July ===
List of shipwrecks: 9 July 1909
Ship	State	Description
Yosemite	United States	The passenger steamer ran aground on a reef near Rock Point in Port Orchard Narrows in Puget Sound four miles (6.4 km) from Bremerton, Washington. Her back was broken and she went to pieces.

=== 10 July ===
List of shipwrecks: 10 July 1909
Ship	State	Description
Lula B.	United States	The steamer destroyed by fire in the Red River near West Point, Arkansas, a total loss.
Petersburg	Russia	The steamer ran aground and was wrecked at Tjellsund, Norway off Narvik. Refloated and sold for scrap.

=== 12 July ===
List of shipwrecks: 12 July 1909
Ship	State	Description
John B. Cowle	United States	The 420-foot (130 m), 4,731 GRT ore carrier was laden with 7,023 tons of iron ore loaded at Two Harbors, Minnesota and bound for Cleveland, Ohio, when she was sunk in a collision with Isaac M. Scott (United States) in dense fog two miles (3.2 km) north of Whitefish Point Light in Lake Michigan. 14 crew died.

=== 15 July ===
List of shipwrecks: 15 July 1909
Ship	State	Description
HMS C11	Royal Navy	The C-class submarine sank in collision with the collier Eddystone (United Kingdom) in the North Sea off Cromer, Norfolk, England. Three survivors.
Laura D.	United States	The sand dredge struck a submerged pile and sank at the Hocking Valley Dock in the Maumee River at Toledo, Ohio.

=== 16 July ===
List of shipwrecks: 16 July 1909
Ship	State	Description
Miles Standish	United States	The tug ran aground on the north west end of Old Silas Reef, near Plum Island in dense fog. Beached on Plum Island to prevent sinking.

=== 20 July ===
List of shipwrecks: 20 July 1909
Ship	State	Description
Martha Stevens	United States	The freighter was sunk in a collision with the tow steamer Confidence (United States) above Robbins Reef Light in New York Bay. The crew were rescued, but one died of exhaustion shortly after.

=== 22 July ===
List of shipwrecks: 22 July 1909
Ship	State	Description
Prome	United Kingdom	The 105-foot (32 m) steam trawler was sunk in a collision with barque "Gladys" (United Kingdom) in the North Sea. Lost with all hands.

=== 23 July ===
List of shipwrecks: 23 July 1912
Ship	State	Description
Columbus	United States	The 19-gross register ton sloop sank in the Gulf of Mexico with the loss of both people on board.

=== 24 July ===
List of shipwrecks: 24 July 1912
Ship	State	Description
Burnadina King	United States	The steamer was totally destroyed by fire at Evansville, Indiana.
Kenosha	United States	The 1,677-gross register ton steam collier sank in heavy weather in 105 feet (32 m) of water in the North Atlantic Ocean six nautical miles (11 km; 6.9 mi) off Fire Island Lighthouse on Fire Island off the south coast of Long Island, New York, and 10 nautical miles (19 km; 12 mi) southeast of Fire Island Inlet. Her crew of 12 or 17 (sources disagree) abandoned ship in two lifeboats and were rescued by Winifred (United States).

=== 25 July ===
List of shipwrecks: 25 July 1909
Ship	State	Description
Vigilancia	United States	The steamer caught fire while laying off Pier 18, Brooklyn and was scuttled to extinguish the fire. Raised and repaired.

=== 27 July ===
List of shipwrecks: 27 July 1909
Ship	State	Description
Waratah	United Kingdom	The Blue Anchor Line ocean liner was due to reach Cape Town on 29 July. No trace was ever found and 211 passengers and crew were lost. Last sighted by Guelph (United Kingdom) on 27 July.

=== 28 July ===
List of shipwrecks: 28 July 1909
Ship	State	Description
Aug. Demarest	United States	The canal boat ran aground between Grassy Point, New York and Stony Point, New York. When the tide dropped she rolled off the flat and filled.
Delaware	United States	The freighter sank at dock at Pier 1, South Philadelphia, Pennsylvania due to a loose plank.

=== 31 July ===
List of shipwrecks: 31 July 1909
Ship	State	Description
Winnebago	United States	The cargo ship struck a rock off Point Arena, California in dense fog and was wrecked.

== August ==
=== 1 August ===
List of shipwrecks: 1 August 1909
Ship	State	Description
Benton	United States	The steamer was destroyed by fire, probably in the Detroit, Michigan, area.
Cadillac	United States	The steamer was sunk in a collision with Geo. L. Craig (United States) at Southeast Bend in the St. Clair River.

=== 4 August ===
List of shipwrecks: 4 August 1909
Ship	State	Description
Perfection	United States	The steamer sprung a leak and sank in shallow water in the Chicago River.

=== 5 August ===
List of shipwrecks: 5 August 1909
Ship	State	Description
Langton Grange	United Kingdom	The 5,852 GRT refrigerated cargo steamer on a passage from Glasgow to Newport in ballast struck submerged Bell Rock, just off North Bishop Island, and got stranded. The ship subsequently broke amidships and sank.
Lucania	United Kingdom	The ocean liner caught fire at Huskisson Dock at Liverpool, England. She sank at her moorings and later was sold for scrap.
Maori	United Kingdom	SS Maori The steamer was wrecked near on the Cape Peninsula neat Llandudno, Cape Town, South Africa, with 32 crew killed.

=== 6 August ===
List of shipwrecks: 6 August 1909
Ship	State	Description
Daily	United States	The steamer sprung a leak and sank two miles (3.2 km) below Commerce, Missouri, a total loss.

=== 10 August ===
List of shipwrecks: 10 August 1909
Ship	State	Description
Josephine Lincoln	United States	The tug sank in the Schuylkill River near the Penrose Ferry Bridge. Raised, repaired and returned to service before 22 September.
Nunivak	United States	The inland freighter, while laid up for the winter, was crushed by ice at dock at the mouth of the Neenana River, District of Alaska, a total loss.

=== 11 August ===
List of shipwrecks: 11 August 1909
Ship	State	Description
USS Nezinscot	United States Navy	During a voyage from the Portsmouth Navy Yard in Kittery, Maine, to Boston, Massachusetts, with a cargo of chains, anchors, and searchlight equipment for the battleship USS Missouri, (United States Navy), the 85-foot (26 m), 115-gross register ton tug capsized in heavy seas in the Atlantic Ocean off Cape Ann, Massachusetts, when her deck cargo shifted. She sank in three minutes with the loss of four lives in approximately 300 feet (91 m) of water, 8 nautical miles (15 km; 9.2 mi) bearing 17 degrees true from Straitsmouth Island Light in Rockport, Massachusetts. There were nine survivors.

=== 13 August ===
List of shipwrecks: 13 August 1909
Ship	State	Description
L. D. Knapp	United States	The canal boat, while under tow by the steamer Walter B. Pollock (United States), was damaged in a collision with the launch James A. Walsh (United States), creating a 12-foot (3.7 m) hole in her hull, resulting in her being beached, probably in the New York City area.

=== 15 August ===
List of shipwrecks: 15 August 1909
Ship	State	Description
Notter	United States	The freight and tow steamer ran aground on Hen and Chickens rocks near the west end of Long Sand Shoal, in Long Island Sound and sank, a total loss.

=== 17 August ===
List of shipwrecks: 17 August 1909
Ship	State	Description
Shawpoint or Shawmont	United States	The barge foundered in the Atlantic Ocean off the Shinnecock Light with the loss of all five crewmen.

=== 18 August ===
List of shipwrecks: 18 August 1909
Ship	State	Description
Daniel Kern	United States	The steamer was sunk in a collision with Geo. W. Elder (United States) in the Columbia River near Waterford, Washington.
Guide	United States	The steamer sank from an open seam in shoal water at Newbern, North Carolina.

=== 19 August ===
List of shipwrecks: 19 August 1909
Ship	State	Description
City of Green Bay	United States	The steamer was destroyed by fire in Saginaw Bay.

=== 20 August ===
List of shipwrecks: 20 August 1909
Ship	State	Description
Adolphe	United Kingdom	The ketch was wrecked in the Teifi Estuary.
Fred Swain	United States	The steamer was destroyed by fire in the Illinois River near Peoria, Illinois.

=== 22 August ===
List of shipwrecks: 22 August 1909
Ship	State	Description
Senator	United States	The steamer was sunk in a collision with Norman B. Ream (United States) one mile (1.6 km) north of Pipe Island in the St. Marys River in shoal water off De Tour, Michigan.

=== 23 August ===
List of shipwrecks: 23 August 1909
Ship	State	Description
Elsie May	United States	The steamer burned at dock at the National Dock, Black Tom Island, Jersey City, New Jersey and sank. Not considered worth raising.
Francis T. Simmons	United States	The dredge sank in 30 feet (9.1 m) of water in Lake Michigan near Chicago.
Nicholas Castania	United States	The steamer was wrecked on the south coast of the Isle of Pines, Cuba between Carpatachi Bay and Hell's Cove. Lost with everybody on board, 2 passengers and 27 crew.

=== 25 August ===
List of shipwrecks: 25 August 1909
Ship	State	Description
Aurelia	United States	The tug was forced onto the bar in heavy wind and high seas at Cold Spring Inlet and was wrecked, a total loss.
Colombia	Argentina	The steamer was rammed, almost cut in two, by Schlesien (German Empire) in the outer Harbor of Montevideo, Uruguay. 60 killed.

=== 26 August ===
List of shipwrecks: 26 August 1909
Ship	State	Description
Collingwood	Canada	The steamer was sunk in a collision with George L. Craig (United States) in the Detroit River.
McCormack	United States	The ship sprung a leak and just made it to dock at Oswego, New York before sinking.
Ohio	United States	Carrying 188 passengers, a crew of 88, and a cargo of 1,100 tons of general merchandise on a voyage from Seattle, Washington, to Prince William Sound on the south-central coast of the District of Alaska, the 3,488-gross register ton, 343-foot (104.5 m) steamer began flooding after she struck a reef in Finlayson Channel on the coast of British Columbia, then sank quickly just before reaching Carter Bay when her boilers exploded after cold seawater reached them. A seasick soldier and three crewmen who remained behind to assist him were lost; the other 187 passengers and 85 crew members reached shore by swimming or in lifeboats and were rescued by the fishing vessel Kingfisher and steamers Humbolt and Rupert City (all flags unknown).

=== 28 August ===
List of shipwrecks: 28 August 1909
Ship	State	Description
Charles A. Eddy	United States	The steamer sprang a leak eight miles (13 km) south east of St. Martin Island in Lake Michigan and was beached.
Na Ma Puk	United States	The steamer sprung a leak and sank on Lake of the Woods. The crew escaped on a barge they were towing.

=== 30 August ===
List of shipwrecks: 30 August 1909
Ship	State	Description
Nina	United States	The steamer burned at dock at Elizabeth City, North Carolina, a total loss.

=== 31 August ===
List of shipwrecks: 31 August 1909
Ship	State	Description
Daily	United States	The steamer sprung a leak in the bow and sank at Canton, Missouri.

=== Unknown date ===
List of shipwrecks: Unknown date August 1909
Ship	State	Description
Excelsior	United States	The decommissioned steamer, stripped of her boiler, engine and everything else of value, was disposed of by burning as a spectator event. She was covered with pitch, tar and oil, anchored off Big Island in Lake Minnetonka and set ablaze. She burned to the waterline and sank in view of 5,000 spectators.

== September ==
=== 3 September ===
List of shipwrecks: 3 September 1909
Ship	State	Description
Gracey Childers	United States	The out of commission steamer was totally destroyed by fire at Paducah, Kentucky.

=== 4 September ===
List of shipwrecks: 4 September 1909
Ship	State	Description
Dalzelline	United States	The steamer filled with water and sank at dock at the foot of Congress Street, Brooklyn, New York, when the fireman fell asleep while filling her water tank, flooding her.

=== 5 September ===
List of shipwrecks: 5 September 1909
Ship	State	Description
Eduard Bohlen	Germany	The wreck of Eduard Bohlen. The cargo ship ran aground on German South-West Africa's Skeleton Coast in a heavy fog.
Petrel	United States	The steamer sank at dock in the Willamette River at Portland, Oregon.

=== 7 September ===
List of shipwrecks: 7 September 1909
Ship	State	Description
Weston	United States	The steamer struck a submerged obstruction and sank between Bismarck, North Dakota and Fort Yates, North Dakota.

=== 8 September ===
List of shipwrecks: 8 September 1909
Ship	State	Description
Clara Cavett	United States	The steamer sprung a leak and sank in a sectional drydock while being repaired in the Allegheny River at Creighton, Pennsylvania. Raised and repaired.

=== 12 September ===
List of shipwrecks: 12 September 1909
Ship	State	Description
Sarah Ann	United Kingdom	The ship was wrecked at Porthgain, Pembrokeshire.

=== 13 September ===
List of shipwrecks: 13 September 1909
Ship	State	Description
Eleanor	United States	The tow steamer was destroyed by fire at Galveston, Texas.
Uyak	United States	During a voyage along the coast of Kodiak Island from Uyak Bay to Karluk with two people but no cargo aboard, the 22-ton, 55-foot (16.8 m) steamer was wrecked on what was reported as "Walcott Rock" – probably a reference to Walcott Reef – with no loss of life.

=== 15 September ===
List of shipwrecks: 15 September 1909
Ship	State	Description
Francesco Morosini	Regia Marina	The decommissioned Ruggiero di Lauria-class ironclad battleship was sunk as a torpedo target at La Spezia, Italy.

=== 16 September ===
List of shipwrecks: 16 September 1909
Ship	State	Description
Islander	United States	The passenger steamer caught fire at the Cornwalls Dock at Alexandria Bay, New York. She burned to the waterline and sank, a total loss.
Ocean Queen	Norway	The 3,188 GRT cargo steamer grounded on a reef off the coast of Makatea while on her maiden journey, and subsequently sunk in 200 fathoms (1,200 ft; 370 m) of water.

=== 18 September ===
List of shipwrecks: 18 September 1909
Ship	State	Description
Industrie	France	The tug sprang a leak and foundered off Boulogne, France; the crew of eight were rescued and landed at Fécamp.
John Pridgeon, Jr.	United States	The steamer sprang a leak in a gale and became waterlogged in Lake Erie, then was turned sideways by waves, capsized, and sank 8 miles off Cleveland, Ohio. Crew rescued by Maryland (United States).

=== 19 September ===
List of shipwrecks: 19 September 1909
Ship	State	Description
C. W. Standart	United States	The steamer filled with water and sank at dock at West New Brighton, New York on Staten Island, when the fireman fell asleep while filling her water tank, flooding her. Later raised. The fireman was found drowned in his cabin.
Monteagle	United States	The steamer struck the submerged foundation of a turning buoy on Mud Lake in the St. Marys River and was beached on Pilot Island. During an attempt to raise her she was destroyed by fire 2 days later.

=== 20 September ===
List of shipwrecks: 20 September 1909
Ship	State	Description
Ascension	United States	1909 Grand Isle hurricane: The steamer was sunk at dock in a violent storm at the foot of Napoleon Avenue, New Orleans, Louisiana.
Bell of the Bends	United States	1909 Grand Isle hurricane: The steamer was sunk at dock by high winds and a submerged floating object at Vicksburg, Mississippi.
Buck Elk	United States	1909 Grand Isle hurricane: The steamer was sunk at dock by a submerged floating object at Vicksburg, Mississippi, a total loss.
Carrie B.	United States	1909 Grand Isle hurricane: The steamer, being used as a pump boat, broke loose from her moorings in heavy wind at Algiers, Louisiana, blowing down the Mississippi River to the foot of Esplanade St. New Orleans where she rolled over and sank.
Conners	United States	1909 Grand Isle hurricane: The steamer was sunk at Vicksburg, Mississippi.
Conquest	United States	1909 Grand Isle hurricane: The steamer was blown loose from her moorings at Bayou Sara, Louisiana and blown up the Mississippi River where she swamped and sank.
F. & J.	United States	1909 Grand Isle hurricane: The motor vessel swamped at Grand Isle, Louisiana.
Fawn	United States	1909 Grand Isle hurricane: The steamer was sunk at Vicksburg, Mississippi.
Francis H.	United States	1909 Grand Isle hurricane: The fishing schooner sank in the hurricane in the Gulf of Mexico off Pensacola, Florida. Lost with all eight crew.
H. C. Bronkman	United States	1909 Grand Isle hurricane: The steamer sank in a severe storm while moored at Arkansas City, Arkansas. Later raised.
Handy	United States	1909 Grand Isle hurricane: The steamer was wrecked and sank in a violent storm in the Mississippi River at Baton Rouge, Louisiana.
Harvester	United States	1909 Grand Isle hurricane: The steamer blew loose from her moorings while tied up at Donaldsonville, Louisiana, and blew out into the Mississippi River where she sank in 98 feet (30 m) of water, a total loss. Her female cook died. The captain and chief engineer survived.
Heloise	United States	1909 Grand Isle hurricane: The steamer broke loose from her moorings in a violent storm at Thibodeaux, Louisiana and sank.
Joe	United States	1909 Grand Isle hurricane: The steamer sank in a violent storm in the Mississippi River at Hanson City, Louisiana.
Lola S.	United States	1909 Grand Isle hurricane: The steamer sank in the Mississippi River in a heavy wind storm at Water Valley, Louisiana.
M. C. Neff	United States	The steamer burned to the waterline while anchored at Duluth, Minnesota.
Maine	United States	1909 Grand Isle hurricane: The launch sank in the hurricane at Grand Bay, Alabama.
Millie W.	United States	1909 Grand Isle hurricane: The steamer broke loose from her moorings in a violent storm at Mount Pleasant Landing, Louisiana and sank in the Mississippi River. Later raised.
Samoa	United States	The steamer was struck by lightning and destroyed by fire at Osceola Mills, Lake Linden, Michigan on the 20th, 21st, or 22nd, a total loss.
S. S. Princess	United States	1909 Grand Isle hurricane: The steamer was sunk by the hurricane at the mouth of St. Catherine Creek.
Troy	United States	The steamer struck a snag and sank in four feet (1.2 m) of water at Poplar Grove, Louisiana, near Columbia, Louisiana.
V. L. Watson	United States	1909 Grand Isle hurricane: The steamer sank in a violent storm while tied up in Bayou des Allemands, Louisiana.
Wade	United States	1909 Grand Isle hurricane: The steamer was sunk while tied to the bank in a violent storm at Water Valley, Louisiana near the head of the Atchafalaya River.
Washington	United States	1909 Grand Isle hurricane: The ferry was sunk while tied up at Donaldsonville, Louisiana, a total loss.
White Rose	United States	1909 Grand Isle hurricane: The steamer was sunk at dock in a violent storm at Baton Rouge, Louisiana.
X Ray	United States	1909 Grand Isle hurricane: The steamer was sunk at dock by the Hurricane at Berwick, Louisiana.

=== 21 September ===
List of shipwrecks: 21 September 1909
Ship	State	Description
Fawn	United States	1909 Grand Isle hurricane: The out of commission steamer was sunk at dock during the hurricane at Vicksburg, Mississippi.
Sam A. Conner	United States	1909 Grand Isle hurricane: The out of commission steamer was sunk at dock during the hurricane at Vicksburg, Mississippi.

=== 25 September ===
List of shipwrecks: 25 September 1909
Ship	State	Description
Gere	Norway	The steamer foundered off Cape Hatteras 9 miles east of the Winter Quarter Lightship. 8 or 12 died.
Oconee	United States	The motor boat was sunk in a collision with T. W. Wellington (United States) at the drawbridge in Spuyten Duyvil Creek. Everyone rescued by T. W. Wellington and Castle Point.

=== 26 September ===
List of shipwrecks: 26 September 1909
Ship	State	Description
Zeeburg	Netherlands	The cargo ship was wrecked in a storm on the south jetty at the entrance to the St. Johns River, she broke her back, a total loss. At least some of her cargo was salvaged. Crew rescued.

=== 27 September ===
List of shipwrecks: 27 September 1909
Ship	State	Description
Sir C. T. Van Straubenzie	Canada	The schooner was rammed and sunk by City of Erie (United States) in Lake Erie 8 miles (13 km) off Long Point, Dunkirk, New York in 200 feet (61 m) of water. The captain, the mate, and the female cook died, possibly one other, and two crewmen survived.

=== 29 September ===
List of shipwrecks: 29 September 1909
Ship	State	Description
Riverside	United States	The lighter sank at dock at Pier 37, Atlantic Docks, Brooklyn, New York overnight on 28–29 September. Raised on 30 September. The engineer's body was found in the engine room.
West Virginia	United States	The freight barge, being towed by Murrell (United States), grounded off Pollock Rip Shoal after losing her towline and drifting. She was pulled off, but sank in 10 fathoms (60 ft; 18 m) of water, a total loss.

=== 30 September ===
List of shipwrecks: 30 September 1909
Ship	State	Description
Ethel	United States	The freighter had mechanical problems resulting in a collision in the Delaware River with a steel buoy on Chester Island Flats causing a leak. She was beached at Thurlow, Pennsylvania. One of her firemen drowned.
Henry Sheldon	United States	The steamer sank from unknown causes at City Landing, Vicksburg, Mississippi.

=== Unknown date ===
List of shipwrecks: Unknown date September 1909
Ship	State	Description
Belle of the Bends	United States	The steamer sank at Peeler's Landing, 40 miles (64 km) above Vicksburg, Mississippi in the Mississippi River. Raised, repaired and returned to service.
George Taulane Jr.	United States	The schooner left Belfast, Georgia on 18 September and vanished.
USS Katahdin	United States Navy	The decommissioned harbor defense ram was sunk as a gunnery target at Rappahannock Spit, Virginia.

== October ==
=== 1 October ===
List of shipwrecks: 1 October 1909
Ship	State	Description
City of Salem	United States	The freighter was rammed and sunk at dock at Arch Street Wharf, Philadelphia by the Philadelphia Police and Fire Department steamer Edwin S. Stewart (United States).

=== 3 October ===
List of shipwrecks: 3 October 1909
Ship	State	Description
Sangstad	Norway	The 3,005 GRT steamer on a passage from Luleå to Middlesbrough with a cargo of iron ore ran aground on Gerdasgrund in Norra Kvarken and subsequently sank.

=== 4 October ===
List of shipwrecks: 4 October 1909
Ship	State	Description
Edith	United States	The tug caught fire and sank at Gibsons Island, Maryland.

=== 5 October ===
List of shipwrecks: 5 October 1909
Ship	State	Description
Helen R	United States	The 284-gross register ton barge was stranded at Flushing, Queens, New York. The only person on board survived.
HMS Lee	Royal Navy	The destroyer was wrecked off Blacksod Bay on the west coast of Ireland.

=== 6 October ===
List of shipwrecks: 6 October 1909
Ship	State	Description
William Carney	United States	The vessel was sunk in a collision with the steamship Dorothy (United States) at the foot of Front Street, Long Island City, New York.

=== 9 October ===
List of shipwrecks: 9 October 1909
Ship	State	Description
Alert	United States	The steamer was sunk in a collision with Breakwater (United States) in Coos Bay at Marshfield, Oregon.
Linea L	United States	The 13-net register ton, 36.6-foot (11.2 m) schooner was driven onto the beach in Portage Bay (57°30′N 156°02′W) on the south coast of the Alaska Peninsula and wrecked during a gale. Her crew of three survived.

=== 10 October ===
List of shipwrecks: 10 October 1909
Ship	State	Description
Charger	United States	Carrying a cargo of 2,250 tons of copper ore, the 1,334-ton, 203.2-foot (61.9 m) scow was beached in a sinking condition in Karta Bay on the east coast of Prince of Wales Island in the Alexander Archipelago in Southeast Alaska. Her crew of six survived, but on 11 October she rolled onto her side and was declared a total loss.
Florence	United States	While in winter quarters in a small canal near the mouth of Stabbine Slough on St. Michael Island in Norton Sound on the coast of the District of Alaska, the 90-gross register ton, 101-foot (30.8 m) sternwheel paddle steamer was blown across the channel during a gale and wrecked with her decks awash, or was crushed by ice. All 22 people aboard survived.
J. H. Sheadle	United States	The steamer went aground just inside the south entrance to Buffalo, New York. She was pulled off on 19 October.

=== 11 October ===
List of shipwrecks: 11 October 1909
Ship	State	Description
Antillies	United States	The steamer grounded on the Bahama Banks. Refloated on 20 October.
Biscayne	United States	1909 Florida Keys hurricane: The tow steamer, laid up for repairs, sank at Boot Key Harbor, Marathon, Florida. Raised on 14 September 1910.
Florida	United States	1909 Florida Keys hurricane: The auxiliary cargo schooner was sunk in the hurricane at Key West, a total loss.
Frontenac	United States	1909 Florida Keys hurricane: The schooner was driven ashore in the hurricane at Key West.
John B. Trevor	United States	The steamer struck a reef between Grace Harbor and Rainbow Cove, Isle Royale in heavy winds and snow and was wrecked.
Nettie J.	United States	1909 Florida Keys hurricane: The tug was sunk in the hurricane at Key West.
Peerless	United States	1909 Florida Keys hurricane: The tow steamer sank at Boot Key Harbor, Marathon, Florida.
Sadie	United States	1909 Florida Keys hurricane: The tug was wrecked or sunk in the hurricane at Key West.
Sybil	United States	1909 Florida Keys hurricane: The tug sank in the hurricane near Key West, Florida, killing 11.

=== 12 October ===
List of shipwrecks: 12 October 1909
Ship	State	Description
George Stone	United States	The cargo ship struck Grubb Reef, off Point Pelee, Lake Erie in a heavy gale and was wrecked, partially breaking up forward. One lifeboat capsized drowning her master, a passenger and four crewmen. Two crewmen held on until the wreck drifted ashore. Nine survivors were taken off the ship by F. M. Osborne (United States). Some of her machinery was salvaged.
Quatsino	United States	During a voyage from Nanaimo, British Columbia, to Cordova, District of Alaska, with a cargo of 3,000 tons of coal, the barge was wrecked in Dixon Entrance on the Canada–United States border.

=== 13 October ===
List of shipwrecks: 13 October 1909
Ship	State	Description
John B. Trevor	United States	The whaleback steamer was wrecked on Rocky Reef near Isle Royale in Lake Superior. Abandoned to the underwriters as constructive total loss. Salvaged in 1910 by F. S. Wiley, Port Arthur, Ontario and towed there for repairs. Repaired and returned to service.

=== 14 October ===
List of shipwrecks: 14 October 1909
Ship	State	Description
Elsie Weatherby	United States	The freighter sank at anchor overnight in the Delaware River above Oldmans Creek. Raised same day.
Major W. Allan	United States	The tug struck the bar and sank at Cold Spring Inlet, a total loss.

=== 15 October ===
List of shipwrecks: 15 October 1909
Ship	State	Description
Quatrino	United Kingdom	The barge was wrecked on Gray Island, British Columbia in Chatham Sound.
Western Star	United States	The steamer went aground just inside the south entrance to Buffalo, New York. She was pulled off on 19 October.

=== 16 October ===
List of shipwrecks: 16 October 1909
Ship	State	Description
Anna M. II	United States	The motor boat was wrecked in a collision with a train ferry towed by Transfer No. 20 (United States) in the East River. The three people aboard the motor boat were rescued by Transfer No. 20.

=== 18 October ===
List of shipwrecks: 18 October 1909
Ship	State	Description
Sallie Marmet	United States	The steamer was blown onto rocks and sank in the Ohio River at Sciotoville, Ohio. Raised and repaired.

=== 19 October ===
List of shipwrecks: 19 October 1909
Ship	State	Description
Ventura	United States	The motor boat was sunk in a collision with tow steamer Eugene Hughes (United States) in Newark Bay.

=== 23 October ===
List of shipwrecks: 23 October 1909
Ship	State	Description
Anne Marie	France	A barge based in Erquy (region of Brittany, France). The vessel was carrying cobblestone from its home port to Saint Malo (same area), was wrecked on the Minquiers, Channel Islands tray.
William D.	United States	The tug, one of three assisting Shenango (United States) in the harbor of Cleveland, Ohio, was capsized and sunk by strong current and prop wash from Shenango. Probably raised.

=== 24 October ===
List of shipwrecks: 24 October 1909
Ship	State	Description
DeWet	United States	The 14-ton, 36-foot (11.0 m) motor schooner was destroyed by fire at Ketchikan, District of Alaska.
Olga	United States	The 43-net register ton, 63.5-foot (19.4 m) motor schooner was wrecked by a storm while lying on the beach at Nome, District of Alaska, with no one on board.

=== 25 October ===
List of shipwrecks: 25 October 1909
Ship	State	Description
Lizzie Gardner	United States	The steamer, laid up for the winter, caught fire and was destroyed at Davenport, Iowa.
Marion	United States	The tug, while pulling mud scows near Hawgood (United States) in the harbor of Cleveland, Ohio, was capsized and sunk by strong current and prop wash from Hawgood when the towline to one of the mud scows snapped, destabilizing the tug. Probably raised.

=== 26 October ===
List of shipwrecks: 26 October 1909
Ship	State	Description
Hestia	United Kingdom	During a voyage from Glasgow, Scotland, to St. John, New Brunswick, Canada, the 2,434-gross register ton steamer struck Old Proprietor Ledge – a reef off Grand Manan, New Brunswick – during a gale and sank 4 nautical miles (7.4 km; 4.6 mi) east-southeast of Southwest Head Light at 44°33′N 066°40′W with the loss of 35 lives. There were six survivors.

=== 28 October ===
List of shipwrecks: 28 October 1909
Ship	State	Description
Gertrude	United States	The motor vessel was damaged in a collision with Pickwick (United States). Pickwick towed Gertrude into shoal water where she filled and sank, probably in the Norfolk, Virginia area.
Shenandoah	United States	The schooner barge was sunk in a collision with Powhattan (United States) one mile (1.6 km) west of the Shovel Lightship. Her engineer was killed.

=== 29 October ===
List of shipwrecks: 29 October 1909
Ship	State	Description
Elsie K.	United States	The tow steamer swamped and sank in high seas off Robbins Reef Light in five feet (1.5 m) of water.
Shenandoah	United States	The freight barge, being towed by International (United States), was sunk in a collision with Powhatan (United States) one mile (1.6 km) east of Shovelful Lightship, in Vineyard Sound. One crewman killed.

=== 30 October ===
List of shipwrecks: 30 October 1909
Ship	State	Description
George E.	United States	The steamer destroyed by fire on Lake Huron one mile (1.6 km) south of Cedarville, Michigan.
Ulrica	United States	The passenger steamer was damaged in a collision in the Christiana River at Wilmington, Delaware with passenger steamer Brandywine (United States) causing her to be beached.

=== 31 October ===
List of shipwrecks: 31 October 1909
Ship	State	Description
Winthrop	United States	Carrying a cargo of 20 tons of general merchandise and a crew of two on a voyage from St. Michael, District of Alaska, to Nelson Island, the 14-gross register ton, 36.9-foot (11.2 m) motor vessel was wrecked without loss of life off Nunivak Island during a storm in the Bering Sea.

== November ==
=== 2 November ===
List of shipwrecks: 2 November 1909
Ship	State	Description
Stagg No. 2	United States	The motor launch was sunk in a collision with City of Savannah (United States) at Paducah, Kentucky. The two occupants were thrown into the river. One was rescued by City of Savannah and the other one by George Cowing (United States).

=== 3 November ===
List of shipwrecks: 3 November 1909
Ship	State	Description
Butterfly	United States	The steamer burned at Martin's Island in the Columbia River, a total loss.

=== 4 November ===
List of shipwrecks: 4 November 1909
Ship	State	Description
Avalon	Norway	The steamer was wrecked at Buff Bay, Jamaica.
George Brawdy	United States	The laid up dredge was destroyed by fire in the Allegheny River at Pittsburgh, Pennsylvania.

=== 5 November ===
List of shipwrecks: 5 November 1909
Ship	State	Description
Alligator	United States	The out of commission freight paddle steamer burned and sank on Lake Crescent in Florida without loss of life.

=== 6 November ===
List of shipwrecks: 6 November 1909
Ship	State	Description
Suwanee	United States	The steamer foundered at the mouth of the Orange River in heavy seas.

=== 7 November ===
List of shipwrecks: 7 November 1909
Ship	State	Description
Falcon	United States	The steamer was wrecked on South Fox Island, Michigan and burned, a total loss.

=== 12 November ===
List of shipwrecks: 12 November 1909
Ship	State	Description
Edith E. Dennis	United States	The Schooner sank in Plum Gut off Fort Terry, Plum Island, New York. Later removed under a US Army Corps of Engineers contract. Her Captain survived, his Wife, child and the other 2 crew died.
Kanawha	United States	The steamer sank at dock in Providence, Rhode Island while unloading. Raised and repaired.

=== 13 November ===
List of shipwrecks: 13 November 1909
Ship	State	Description
Weston	United States	The steamer was damaged in a collision with Ward Ames (United States) in the St Marys River and was beached.

=== 14 November ===
List of shipwrecks: 14 November 1909
Ship	State	Description
La Seyne	France	The 2,379 GRT French Messageries Maritimes liner out of Batavia, collided with the 5,247 GRT steamship Onda (United Kingdom), departing Singapore in the Rhio Strait, near Pulo Sau Light near Singapore at 04:35. La Seyne sank in under two minutes with 61 of the crew and passengers saved by Onda with some 97 lost. Many of the lost were lost to shark attack. There was no loss of life aboard Onda but that ship had heavy bow damage.
Ramapo	United States	The tow steamer filled and sank at dock at the Manhassett steamship Pier, Jersey City, New Jersey when she was snagged on the dock on a rising tide. Raised and returned to service.
W. M. Porter	United States	The steamer burned at Oak Hill Landing, Bayou Teche, Louisiana.

=== 16 November ===
List of shipwrecks: 16 November 1909
Ship	State	Description
Commerce	United States	The schooner barge became waterlogged, capsized, broke up, and sank off Sheboygan, Wisconsin. The crew were rescued by the tug Reiss (United States).
Frances Fisher	United Kingdom	Frances Fisher beached at Dieppe 28 November 1909 The barque, on a voyage with coke from River Tyne, England, to Carrizal Bajo, Chile, collided with the steamer Dalmatia (United Kingdom), Calcutta for London, near the Royal Sovereign Lightship, English Channel, and was abandoned; the crew recued by Dalmatia; she drifted ashore on the same day at Saint-Valery-en-Caux, France. Refloated on 27 November and towed towards Dieppe and beached. Completely broke up in a storm on 30 November.
Francis Hinton	United States	The steam barge became waterlogged in a gale with 60-mile-per-hour (97 km/h) winds on Lake Michigan and stranded on Two Rivers Point in Maritime Bay on the coast of Wisconsin, 1.9 miles (3.1 km) northeast of the Manitowoc River. Her crew of 12 reached shore safely in a yawl. Her wreck eventually broke up and sank, a total loss. It lies in 15 to 20 feet (4.6 to 6.1 m) of water at 44°06.67′N 087°37.876′W, within the boundaries of the Wisconsin Shipwreck Coast National Marine Sanctuary.
Varuna	United States	The steam yacht was wrecked at Madeira in a gale. One crewman was lost.

=== 17 November ===
List of shipwrecks: 17 November 1909
Ship	State	Description
Rome	Canada	The steamer burned at Lime Island, a total loss.

=== 18 November ===
List of shipwrecks: 18 November 1909
Ship	State	Description
Louis Pahlow	United States	The steamer broke her steering chains two miles (3.2 km) off the Sturgeon Bay Ship Canal in a gale and snowstorm on 16 November. She was anchored and abandoned. One crewman drowned after refusing to abandon ship and was washed overboard after her lifeboat left. Most of the crew made it to shore in the boat. Her captain and two crewmen were rescued by the lighthouse tender Sumac (United States). By 17 November she had dragged anchor within one mile (1.6 km) of the beach and she was beached on 18 November to be pumped out.

=== 20 November ===
List of shipwrecks: 20 November 1909
Ship	State	Description
St. Croix	United States	The steamer burned off Point Dume, California. Her 96 passengers and all crew members made it to shore in her lifeboats.

=== 22 November ===
List of shipwrecks: 22 November 1909
Ship	State	Description
Boston	United States	The steamer went ashore at Kenilworth, Illinois in a gale.
S. H. Prince	United States	The steamer was wrecked in the Chicago River in a gale.

=== 23 November ===
List of shipwrecks: 23 November 1909
Ship	State	Description
Gem	United States	The steamer hit a snag, sprung a leak, and sank at a wharf in New Orleans.

=== 24 November ===
List of shipwrecks: 24 November 1909
Ship	State	Description
Alf	Norway	The barque ran aground on Haisborough Sands and was wrecked. Of 15 crew, 4 died; others rescued by Chanticleer and the Cromer lifeboat Louisa Heartwell ( Royal National Lifeboat Institution).

=== 25 November ===
List of shipwrecks: 25 November 1909
Ship	State	Description
Mary H. Miller	United States	The steamer hit a snag and sank in the Yazoo River three miles (4.8 km) north of Yazoo City.
Oscar T. Flint	United States	The wooden steam barge burned to the waterline and sank in 30 feet (9 m) of water while anchored in Lake Huron off the coast of Michigan east of the Thunder Bay River and nine miles (14 km) southeast of Alpena, Michigan, at 45.026133°N 83.347383°W.

=== 26 November ===
List of shipwrecks: 26 November 1909
Ship	State	Description
Argo	United States	The steamer broke her wheel crossing the bar of the Tillamook River, she drifted out to sea and sank. Passengers and crew taken off by life saving crew, their lifeboat capsized drowning two women passengers. One crewman did not make it to the lifeboats and was lost.

=== 27 November ===
List of shipwrecks: 27 November 1909
Ship	State	Description
Douglas Hall	United States	The steamer struck an obstruction and sank in the Great Kanawha River near Davis Creek.
Lancelot	United Kingdom	The spritsail barge was driven ashore in West Bay, Dorset.

=== 29 November ===
List of shipwrecks: 29 November 1909
Ship	State	Description
Levernbank	United Kingdom	The barque was abandoned in the Atlantic Ocean 300 nautical miles (560 km) west of the Isles of Scilly. She was on a voyage from Bilbao, Spain to Cardiff, Glamorgan.

=== 30 November ===
List of shipwrecks: 30 November 1909
Ship	State	Description
Nueces	United States	The steamer ran aground on French Reef, Florida Keys. Refloated on 4 December.
Ottawa	Canada	The wrecking tug burned to the waterline and sank off Outer Island, of the Apostle Islands after pulling off the wrecked John H. Hoyt (United States). Machinery and equipment were salvaged in May 1910 and September 1911. The crew transferred to John H. Hoyt.

=== Unknown date ===
List of shipwrecks: unknown November 1909
Ship	State	Description
John H. Hoyt	United States	The steamer ran aground on Outer Island, of the Apostle Islands sometime between 13–16 November. The vessel was pulled off by tugs on 29 November.

== December ==
=== 1 December ===
List of shipwrecks: 1 December 1909
Ship	State	Description
Marie Palmer	United States	The schooner, under tow by the tug Edgar F. Coney (United States), ran aground on Frying Pan Shoals due to confusing the Frying Pan Shoals Light with the Cape Fear Light. After failed attempts to pull her off she was stripped and abandoned on 3 December.

=== 2 December ===
List of shipwrecks: 2 December 1909
Ship	State	Description
Carrie V.	United States	The steamer struck an obstruction and sank in the Ohio River at Straight Ripple 12 to 14 miles (19 to 23 km) below Gallipolis, Ohio.
Iéna	French Navy	The target hulk (a former battleship which had exploded on 12 March 1907) had just left her mooring off the Île des Porquerolles, near Toulon, under tow to be scuttled in deep water, when she foundered.
Virginia	United States	The tow steamer listed to starboard and sank in 15 feet (4.6 m) of water in the Moser Channel, Florida while coaling. Later raised.
Whitewood	United Kingdom	The screw collier left Hull on 2 December 1909 bound for Bremen. Not heard of after this date.

=== 3 December ===
List of shipwrecks: 3 December 1909
Ship	State	Description
Ellan Vannin	(United Kingdom) Isle of Man	The paddle steamer sank in Liverpool Bay in a Force 11 gale. All 36 passengers and crew killed.

=== 5 December ===
List of shipwrecks: 5 December 1909
Ship	State	Description
Albert Y. Gowen	United States	The sand dredge struck a reef of dredged rock off Cedar Point jetty in Sandusky Bay, Lake Erie and was beached on Cedar Point.
Henry Steinbrenner	United States	The steamer was sunk in a collision with Harry A. Berwind (United States) near Round Island in the St Marys River in 30 feet (9.1 m) of water. Raised, repaired and returned to service.

=== 6 December ===
List of shipwrecks: 6 December 1909
Ship	State	Description
Badger State	United States	The steamer was destroyed by fire while docked at Marine City, Michigan.
Iona	United States	The 5-ton 26-foot (7.9 m) motor schooner was lost in Sitka Bay (57°03′N 135°20′W) in Southeast Alaska after the vessel Hegg (United States) struck her. Her crew of three survived.
Majestic	United States	The steamer was wrecked at Pfeiffer Point, California.
Park City	United States	The steamer struck a hidden obstruction and sank in 20 feet (6.1 m) of water near Sunny Side Landing, or Glen Mary, Kentucky on the Kentucky River, a total loss.

=== 8 December ===
List of shipwrecks: 8 December 1909
Ship	State	Description
Batavier IV	Netherlands	The ship collided with a fishing vessel in the New Waterway and was beached. She was refloated, repaired and returned to service.
Bob Ballard	United States	The steamer struck an obstruction and sank in eight feet (2.4 m) of water in the Ohio River at Ironton, Ohio. Raised and repaired.
Clarion	United States	The freighter struck a shoal, caught fire, burned and sank in Lake Erie one mile (1.6 km) south east of Southeast Shoal Lightship in Lake Michigan. One crewman died fighting the fire, one died on a lifeboat and another lifeboat with 13 crew on board disappeared and were lost. Six were rescued by L. C. Hanna (United States).
Marquette & Bessemer No. 2	United States	The train ferry sank in Lake Erie in a heavy gale with snow with the loss of all crew, variously reported as between 30 and 38 lives.
Oregona	United States	The steamer struck a floating obstruction and sank near "Coffey Chute".
Unknown	Unknown	A fishing vessel was sunk in a collision with Batavier IV (Netherlands) in the New Waterway.
W. C. Richardson	United States	The cargo ship went aground on a shoal one and a half miles (2.4 km) off Buffalo, New York in Lake Erie in a storm, took a severe list and sank, a total loss. The ship's female cook was washed overboard and drowned. Four crewmen set off in a lifeboat against orders and also drowned. Survivors were rescued by William A. Payne (United States). The wreck was broken up with explosives beginning on 9 October 1913 and ending in September 1914 with her boilers, machinery, and metal brought up for scrap.

=== 9 December ===
List of shipwrecks: 9 December 1909
Ship	State	Description
J. S. Blazier	United States	The tow steamer sank at dock overnight at Ironville Dock in the Maumee River at Toledo, Ohio. She had been used for icebreaking the day before and may have been damaged.

=== 10 December ===
List of shipwrecks: 10 December 1909
Ship	State	Description
Nancy	United Kingdom	The schooner was rammed and sunk at anchor by trawler "Hungarian" (United Kingdom). Crew rescued by "Hungarian". Later raised, repaired and returned to service.
Portland	United States	The tow steamer ran aground near York, Maine and sank. Raised and repaired.
Reliance	United States	The steamer was holed by ice and capsized in the St. Clair River.
Swan	United States	The laid up steamer was wrecked by ice and sank at Patriot, Indiana. Her boiler and machinery was salvaged.

=== 12 December ===
List of shipwrecks: 12 December 1909
Ship	State	Description
Ashtabula	United States	The steamer ran aground on a bar at the entrance to Port Burwell, Ontario. The vessel was refloated on 28 December and taken to Cleveland for repairs.

=== 13 December ===
List of shipwrecks: 13 December 1909
Ship	State	Description
Governor Ames	United States	The five-masted schooner was wrecked in a gale four nautical miles (7.4 km) off Cape Hatteras on the North Carolina coast. Thirteen of the fourteen aboard perished, including the master and his wife.
Unknown	United States	The dredge, under tow by the tug Tormentor (United States), sank in hurricane-force winds and high seas between Cape Lookout and Frying Pan Shoals (33°46′N 77°04′W). Her captain and engineer, and the tug's fireman, were washed overboard and drowned.

=== 16 December ===
List of shipwrecks: 16 December 1909
Ship	State	Description
Bernie Holmes	United States	The tug burned and sank in the Brazos River.
F. A. Meyer	United States	The steamer sprung a leak, probably caused by ice, on Lake Erie and sank 22 miles (35 km) east north east of South East Shoal Light in 12 fathoms (72 ft; 22 m) of water.

=== 17 December ===
List of shipwrecks: 17 December 1909
Ship	State	Description
City of Warsaw	United States	The unmanned steamer was broke loose from her moorings by ice at Cape Girardeau, Missouri and lodged on rocks one mile (1.6 km) below Ray's Landing, Missouri. Probable total loss.

=== 20 December ===
List of shipwrecks: 20 December 1909
Ship	State	Description
Acorn	United States	The steamer was sunk by ice in the Mississippi River near Davenport, Iowa. She was raised and repaired.
Penelope	United States	The tug caught fire on Lake Erie off Avon Point. Her crew abandoned ship in her boat and made it to shore. The tug drifted until grounding in shallow water and burned to the waterline, a total loss.

=== 22 December ===
List of shipwrecks: 26 December 1909
Ship	State	Description
Wonderer	United States	The tug sank at dock over night at Pier 46, Philadelphia. Raised on 24 December.

=== 26 December ===
List of shipwrecks: 26 December 1909
Ship	State	Description
Ada K. Damon	United States	The wreck of Ada K. Damon in 2005. The schooner was wrecked on Crane Beach in Ipswich, Massachusetts, after her anchor chain broke during a snowstorm, setting her adrift. Her five crew members survived.
Columbia	United States	The steamer was hit and sunk at the Standard Oil Company dock at Seattle, Washington, by the steamer Tiverton (United States).
Crown	Norway	The barque was abandoned in the Atlantic Ocean at 28°39′N 44°39′W. The steamer Kilsyth (United Kingdom) rescued her crew. She was reported still afloat off the East Coast of the United States in the summer of 1910.
Davis Palmer	United States	Carrying a cargo of coal, the 305-foot (93 m), 2,965-gross register ton five-masted schooner ran aground on Graves Ledge – a reef in Broad Sound – off the coast of Massachusetts, drifted off the reef, and sank in an estimated 30 to 40 feet (9.1 to 12.2 m) of water at 42°22′19″N 070°55′29″W with the loss of her entire crew of 14.
John A. Briggs	United States	The barge, under tow by the tow steamer Thurmond (United States), broke her tow in a strong gale 15 nautical miles (28 km; 17 mi) northeast of Barnegat, New Jersey, and was lost with all six crew.
Thurmond	United States	While searching for survivors of the crews of barges she had been forced to cut loose, the 1,253-gross register ton whaleback – operating as a tow steamer – filled with water and became waterlogged in a strong gale and was wrecked on a bar 200 feet (61 m) off Seaside Park, New Jersey, with the loss of 10 lives. Her survivors were rescued by United States Life-Saving Service personnel from the Toms River Life-Saving Station. Her wreck broke up and sank in 14 feet (4.3 m) of water and was long known as the "Boiler Wreck". It was not identified as that of Thurmond until 1984.

=== 29 December ===
List of shipwrecks: 29 December 1909
Ship	State	Description
Capela	United States	While under tow by the motor vessel Neptune (United States), the 12-gross register ton, 33.3-foot (10.1 m) motor vessel drifted ashore and was wrecked on the northeast coast of Vank Island (56°29′N 132°38′W) in the Stikine Strait in the Alexander Archipelago in Southeast Alaska after Neptune's gasoline engine broke down. One man from Capela's crew drowned in the wreck and another died of exposure and exhaustion shortly after reaching shore.

=== 31 December ===
List of shipwrecks: 31 December 1909
Ship	State	Description
Olin J. Stephens	United States	The tow steamer was almost totally destroyed by fire at dock at Mattituck, New York.
Wash Gray	United States	The steamer was damaged by ice while being used as an icebreaker and sank at Louisville, Kentucky. Raised on 8 January 1910.

=== Unknown date ===
List of shipwrecks: Unknown date 1909
Ship	State	Description
Jimmie	United States	The tug left Sabine, Texas for Galveston, Texas on 5 December and disappeared, with a crew of five.

== Unknown date ==
List of shipwrecks: Unknown date 1909
Ship	State	Description
America	United States	The passenger and package delivery steamer ran aground in the Great Lakes. She was refloated, repaired, and returned to service.
Charmer No. 2	United States	With no one on board, the 12-gross register ton sternwheel motor paddle vessel foundered in the Mississippi River at New Madrid, Missouri.
Congress	United Kingdom	The steamer was swamped by a wave off St. Ives, Cornwall. Three people swept overboard were rescued.
Kyle	United States	With no one on board, the 9-gross register ton sternwheel motor paddle vessel foundered in the Mississippi River off Tiptonville, Tennessee.
Leal	United States	The 20-gross register ton screw steamer was lost in a collision with the screw steamer Perico (United Kingdom) in the Panama Canal Zone. All three people on board survived.
Lillian	United States	The motor boat, laid up for the Winter, sank and filled with mud at Galena, Illinois sometime in the Spring.
USS Nicholson	United States Navy	The decommissioned Blakely-class torpedo boat was sunk as a target.
USS O'Brien	United States Navy	The decommissioned Blakely-class torpedo boat was sunk as a target.
San Mateo	United States	The steamer was damaged by ice and went aground in the Bering Sea, becoming a total loss.
