= SS Langton Grange =

SS Langton Grange is the name of the following ships of the Houlder Line:

- SS Langton Grange (1896), wrecked 5 August 1909
- SS Langton Grange (1918)
- SS Langton Grange (1942)
