= USS Nezinscot =

Tugboat of the United States Navy

History

United States
- Name: SS DeWitt C. Ivans (1897–1898); USS Nezinscot (1898–1909)
- Namesake: The Nezinscot River in Maine
- Owner: Moran and Company, United States Navy
- Builder: Neafie & Levy, Philadelphia, Pennsylvania
- Laid down: 1897
- Launched: 1898
- Acquired: 25 March 1898
- Commissioned: 2 April 1898
- Fate: Capsized and sank on 11 August 1909

General characteristics
- Class & type: tug
- Tonnage: 115 grt
- Length: 85 ft 0 in (25.91 m)
- Beam: 19 ft 0 in (5.79 m)
- Draft: 8 ft 0 in (2.44 m)
- Complement: 9

USS Nezinscot was a United States Navy tug commissioned in 1898 that served during the Spanish–American War. She sank in 1909.

== Construction ==
Nezinscot was constructed by Neafie & Levy in 1897 as the 85-foot (26-meter) iron-hulled steam tug SS DeWitt C. Ivans for Moran and Company.

== Service ==
The United States Navy purchased DeWitt C. Evans for $30,000 on 25 March 1898. It commissioned her on 2 April 1898 as USS Nezinscot. She operated from Key West, Florida, serving as part of the North Atlantic Fleet during the Spanish–American War. After the war ended, she remained at Key West until mid-1900, when she moved to Norfolk, Virginia.

In early 1901, Nezinscot moved to her new base at Portsmouth Navy Yard in Kittery, Maine. For the next eight-and-a-half years, she operated from the navy yard, towing vessels ranging in size from small auxiliary barges to the battleship USS Missouri. She also made brief voyages to the New York Navy Yard in Brooklyn, New York, ports in Maine, and most frequently to Boston, Massachusetts.

== Loss ==
While steaming from the Portsmouth Navy Yard to Boston carrying a cargo of chains, anchors, and searchlight equipment for the battleship Missouri, Nezinscot capsized and sank when her deck load shifted in heavy seas off Cape Ann, Massachusetts, on 11 August 1909. There were four fatalities among her nine-man crew.

The wreck of Nezinscot lies in 300 feet (91 m) of water off Rockport, Massachusetts, 8 nautical miles (15 km) from Straitsmouth Island Light.
