= SS Sangstad (1904) =

History

Norway
- Name: Sangstad
- Owner: A. F. Klaveness
- Operator: A. F. Klaveness
- Builder: R. Thompson & Sons, Southwick
- Yard number: 233
- Launched: 16 May 1904
- Sponsored by: Mrs. Andresen
- Commissioned: June 1904
- Home port: Sandefjord
- Identification: Call sign MBST
- Fate: Wrecked, 3 October 1909

General characteristics
- Type: Cargo ship
- Tonnage: 3,005 GRT; 1,916 NRT; 5,630 DWT
- Length: 325 ft 2 in (99.11 m)
- Beam: 48 ft 6 in (14.78 m)
- Depth: 21 ft 6 in (6.55 m)
- Installed power: 274 Nhp
- Propulsion: North Eastern Marine Engineering Co 3-cylinder triple expansion
- Speed: 9.0 knots

Sangstad was a steam cargo ship built in 1904 by the Robert Thompson & Sons of Sunderland for A. F. Klaveness & Co of Sandefjord. She was primarily employed as an ore carrier and collier doing tramp trade during her career.

== Design and construction ==
In March 1903 A. F. Klaveness & Co had a cargo ship SS Sangstad delivered which they planned to use on West India to North America route as a fruit carrier. On November 25, 1903, it was reported that SS Sangstad was removed from Norwegian registration and sold to Compañia Mexicana de Navegación, and an order for a new steamer with the same name was placed. The ship was laid down at Robert Thompson & Sons Southwick shipyard in Sunderland, launched on 16 May 1904 (yard number 233), with Mrs. Andresen, wife of the ships's commander Captain M. A. Andresen, being the sponsor. After successful completion of sea trials the ship was delivered to her owner in June 1904. On June 8, 1904, a new company (Dampskibsaktieselskabet "Sangstad"), a subsidiary of A. F. Klaveness & Co, with NOK 550,000 starting capital was registered in Larvik to operate the new vessel.

As built, the ship was 325 feet 2 inches (99.11 m) long (between perpendiculars) and 48 feet 6 inches (14.78 m) abeam, a mean draft of 21 feet 6 inches (6.55 m). Sangstad was assessed at 3,005 GRT, 1,916 NRT and 5,630 DWT. The vessel had a steel hull, and a single 274 nhp triple-expansion steam engine, with cylinders of 24-inch (61 cm), 39-inch (99 cm), and 65-inch (170 cm) diameter with a 42-inch (110 cm) stroke, that drove a single screw propeller, and moved the ship at up to 9.0 knots (10.4 mph; 16.7 km/h).

== Operational history ==
After delivery Sangstad was immediately chartered to transport cargo to North America. The ship left Sunderland for her maiden voyage on June 23, 1904, for Pensacola and Gulf ports and returned to Hamburg on September 3.

Sangstad arrived at Barry on September 28, 1904, and upon loading, departed on October 7 for Rio de Janeiro arriving there on November 3. On November 21, 1904, the ship was chartered for the period of 12 months by Tweedie Trading Company of New York at a rate of £825 per calendar month, and left Rio de Janeiro for Bahia on the same day. The vessel loaded 3,910 tons of manganese ore and left Bahia on December 24, 1904, arriving at Baltimore on January 17, 1905. On February 18, 1905, the ship left New York for Odessa where she arrived on March 19. Sangstad then proceeded to load wheat at ports of Sulina and Ibrail and sailed for Rotterdam on April 30 arriving there on May 17. From there the ship continued on to Middlesbrough, departed it on June 9 for Montreal and reached it on June 25. In July the ship conducted several trips up and down St. Lawrence river between Montreal and North Sydney. On August 5, 1905 Sangstad left Portland for Buenos Aires with a cargo of 636,000 feet of spruce timber. After arrival in Argentina the ship sailed back to North America and reached Philadelphia on December 18. On October 6, 1905, the charter with Tweedie Trading Company was extended for 3 more months at a rate of £900 per calendar month.

The vessel then was sub-chartered by the New York Central & Hudson River Railroad along with other ships to transport 10,000 tons of paving bricks and other construction materials to the Panama Canal area. The ship left New York on January 22, 1906, and arrived at Colón a week later. After unloading, the ship proceeded back to the US via Cuban ports of Cárdenas and Matanzas and arrived in Philadelphia on March 18. Sangstad was then subchartered to carry cotton to Europe, and continued to Wilmington arriving there on April 12. After loading 11,782 bales of cotton, the ship departed for Bremerhaven on May 1. Between June and September Sangstad was involved in iron ore transportation from Wabana to Philadelphia and Rotterdam. On her return journey from Europe she departed Stettin on November 6 with a cargo of sugar for Philadelphia, but ran into some heavy weather on her trip and arrived at St.John's on November 26 with significant damage about her decks and a broken rudder. She was put into dock for repairs which took about a month to finish delaying her arrival at Philadelphia until December 30, 1906.

On January 15, 1907, the ship left Philadelphia for Colón, and returned to New York on March 21 after visiting Cuban ports and New Orleans on her way back. The vessel was then employed in coal and iron ore trade for the remainder of the year. Sangstad left Norfolk with a cargo of coal for Colón on April 1, and on her return voyage she called at Daiquirí and sailed from it on April 24 with 5,375 tons of iron ore arriving at Baltimore on May 3. During the summer 1907 the ship was involved in coal carriage between Philadelphia and Tampico and iron ore from Cuba on her return journeys. During the fall and winter 1907 the vessel was employed on Baltimore-Colón-Cuba-Baltimore trade route. For example, Sangstad brought 5,375 tons of iron ore from Cuba to Baltimore on September 22. On October 11 Sangstad left Newport News with 5,083 tons of coal bound for Colón and from there proceeded to Cuba where the ship loaded 5,300 tons of iron ore and sailed for Baltimore reaching it on November 9. After unloading Sangard loaded 2,100 barrels of spikes and proceeded to Newport News where she took on 4,837 tons of coal and left for Colón on November 20. On her return voyage the ship stopped at Daiquirí and loaded 5,300 tons of iron ore for Baltimore which she reached on December 24, 1907.

On January 4, 1908, the ship departed Newport News with about 5,000 tons of coal for Colón, and returned to Norfolk on February 7. The vessel then proceeded to Fernandina to load 2,300 tons of phosphate rock for Hamburg, then stopped at Savannah to load other cargo including 174 bales of cotton and left for Europe on February 20. Sangstad returned to North Sydney on April 28, and was employed on the coal trade route to Montreal and Quebec during the months of May and June 1908. For the rest of the year Sangstad was chartered to carry iron ore between Wabana and Middlesbrough. After finishing her charter, the ship sailed for Argentina on December 17 via Cádiz and arrived at Buenos Aires on January 28, 1909. Sangstad left Buenos Aires on her return voyage to Hamburg and Antwerp with a cargo of wheat on March 27 and arrived in Europe in early May. The ship was then chartered again to carry iron ore from Kiruna between the Swedish port of Luleå and Burntisland and Middlesbrough.

=== Sinking ===
On October 3, 1909 Sangstad left Luleå on her final voyage with a cargo of iron ore for Middlesbrough. At around 05:00 the ship went aground on Gerdasgrund, close to Nygrund island in Norra Kvarken. The ship initially stayed afloat allowing the captain, his family and the crew to disembark, but sank in approximately 10 fathoms (60 ft; 18 m) of water after 45 minutes. The crew was taken aboard by two passing steamers, Westa and Phoenix, and was landed at Hernøsand and Yxpila. One crewmember died in the accident.
