= 1909 Florida Keys hurricane =

Category 3 Atlantic hurricane

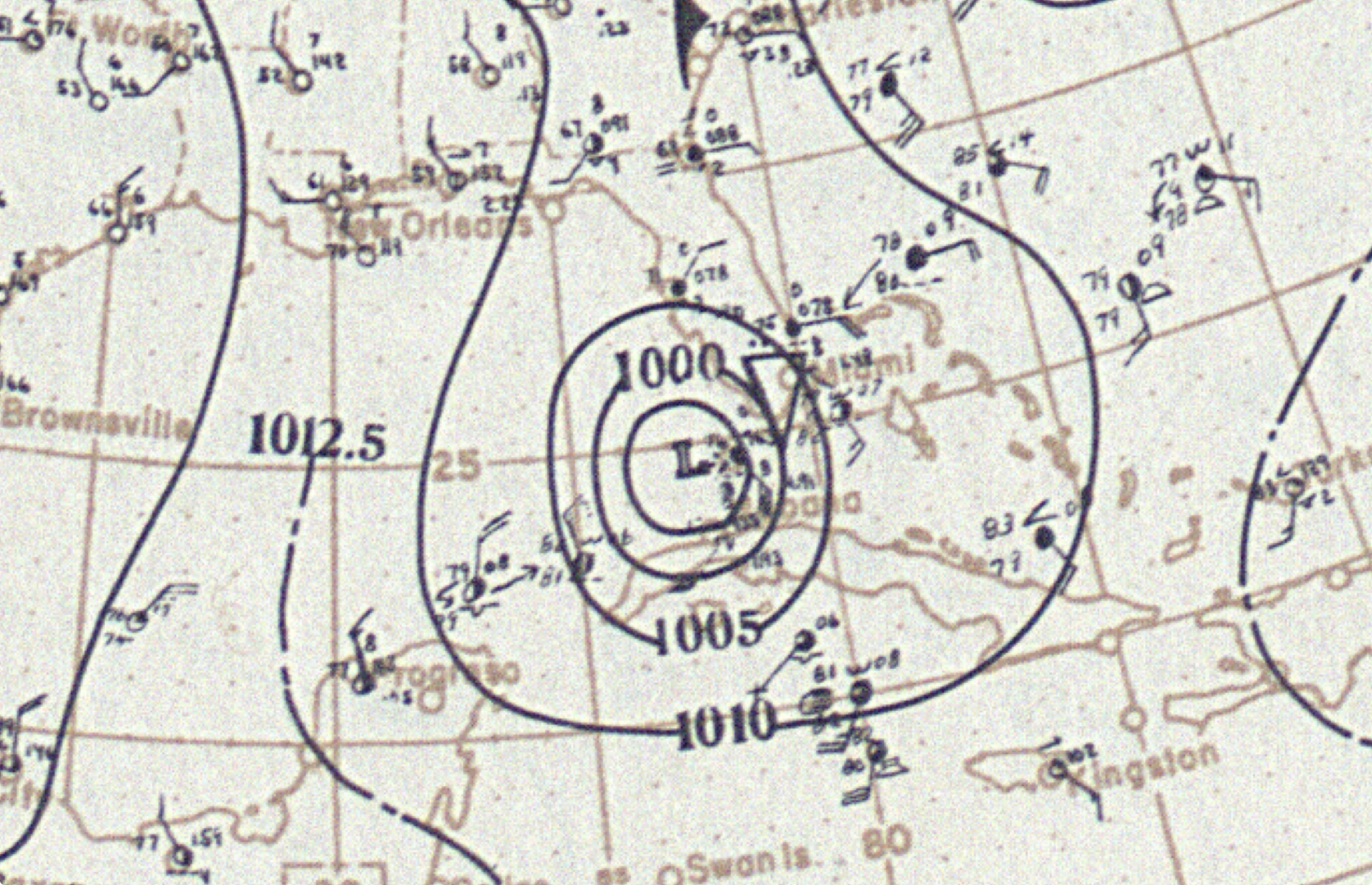
- Surface weather analysis of the hurricane on October 11, approaching landfall in the Florida Keys

Meteorological history
- Formed: October 6, 1909
- Dissipated: October 13, 1909

Category 3 major hurricane
- 1-minute sustained (SSHWS/NWS)
- Highest winds: 120 mph (195 km/h)
- Lowest pressure: 957 mbar (hPa); 28.26 inHg

Overall effects
- Fatalities: 34
- Damage: At least $3 million (1909 USD)
- Areas affected: Cuba, Mexico, Florida, Bahamas
- Part of the 1909 Atlantic hurricane season

The 1909 Florida Keys hurricane caused severe damage in Cuba and the Florida Keys. The twelfth tropical cyclone and fifth hurricane of season, the storm was first detected in the Caribbean Sea offshore Colombia on October 6. Initially a tropical depression, the system became a tropical storm early on the next day while heading northwestward. By October 8, the storm became a Category 1 hurricane on the modern day Saffir–Simpson hurricane wind scale to the southwest of Jamaica. The hurricane curved to the west-northwest and intensified throughout the next day, becoming Category 3 intensity late on October 9. A major hurricane, the cyclone peaked with sustained winds of 120 mph (195 km/h) early on October 10. Later that day, it turned to the north and made landfall in Pinar del Río Province. After traversing the western extremity of Cuba, the storm entered the Straits of Florida and turned northeastward. The hurricane made landfall near Marathon, Florida, late on October 11 with winds of 115 mph (185 km/h). Thereafter, the system weakened quickly while crossing the northwestern Bahamas and the western Atlantic Ocean, falling to tropical storm intensity late on October 12. About 24 hours later, it weakened to a tropical depression and subsequently dissipated northeast of Bermuda.

In western Cuba, strong winds and large waves left severe damage. The cities of Cayuco and La Fe in Pinar del Río Province were completely destroyed, while Guane experienced considerable devastation. Every house in Puerto Esperanza suffered damage due to strong winds. In Havana, the storm caused five fatalities and about $1 million (1909 USD) in damage. (Note: All damage figures are in 1909 USD, unless otherwise noted) The large waves reached the coast of Mexico's Yucatán Peninsula, causing many fishermen and their families to drown. In the Florida Keys, damage total about $2 million in Key West alone, with about half of the city destroyed, while two fatal injuries occurred. Farther north, the storm destroyed workers camps for construction of the Florida East Coast Railway and drowned 12 people after a tugboat wrecked at Bahia Honda Key. In Miami, several buildings were deroofed, while the newly built March Villa hotel suffered severe damage; impact otherwise was primarily limited to downed trees, however. Overall, the hurricane is attributed to 34 fatalities and over $3 million in damage.

== Meteorological history ==
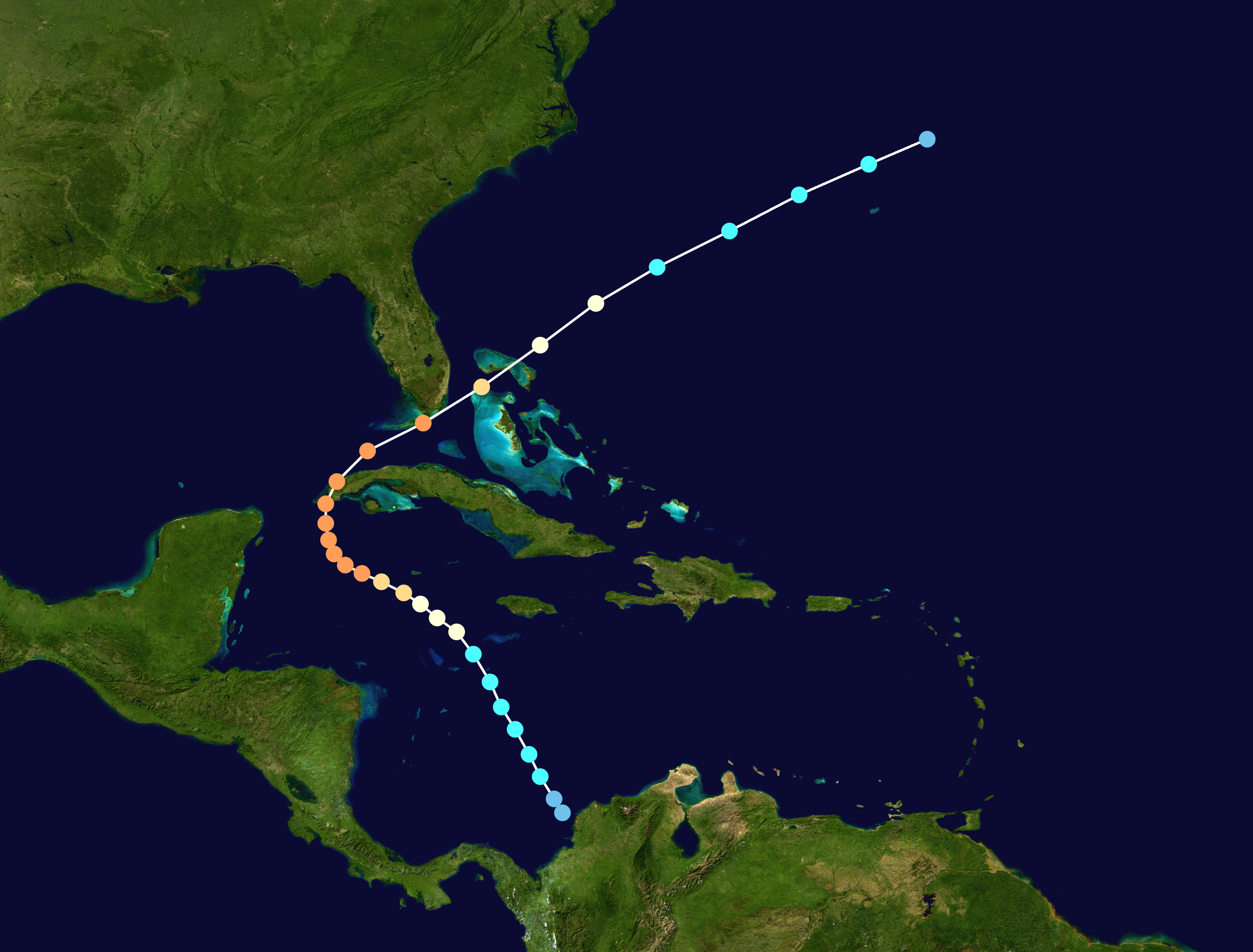
Map plotting the storm's track and intensity, according to the Saffir–Simpson scale Map key Saffir–Simpson scale Tropical depression (≤38 mph, ≤62 km/h) Tropical storm (39–73 mph, 63–118 km/h) Category 1 (74–95 mph, 119–153 km/h) Category 2 (96–110 mph, 154–177 km/h) Category 3 (111–129 mph, 178–208 km/h) Category 4 (130–156 mph, 209–251 km/h) Category 5 (≥157 mph, ≥252 km/h) Unknown Storm type Tropical cyclone Subtropical cyclone Extratropical cyclone, remnant low, tropical disturbance, or monsoon depression

The origins of the system over the southwestern Caribbean Sea are uncertain, though there were indications of a developing disturbance over the south-central Caribbean as early as October 2. On October 6, the first observations relating to this tropical cyclone were recorded by a ship near 11°N 76°W. The system was classified as a tropical depression on this day beginning at 12:00 UTC, while it was located about 35 mi (55 km) northwest of Cartagena, Colombia. Initially moving northwestward, the cyclone intensified into a tropical storm early on the next day. While passing southwest of Jamaica at 12:00 UTC on October 8, the storm became a Category 1 hurricane. Around that time, the hurricane recurved to the west-northwest. The cyclone continued to deepen, reaching Category 2 intensity by 06:00 UTC on October 9 and Category 3 strength about 12 hours later. It became the season's fourth major hurricane, Early on October 10, the storm peaked with maximum sustained winds of 120 mph (195 km/h), before turning northward later that day.

Shortly after 00:00 UTC on October 11, the hurricane made landfall in the Sandino municipality of Pinar del Río Province, Cuba, at the same intensity. The cyclone reached the Straits of Florida after crossing the far western portion of Cuba in about six hours. Re-curving and accelerating to the northeast, the storm weakened slightly before making landfall near Marathon, Florida, with winds of 115 mph (185 km/h) around 18:00 UTC on October 11. On Knights Key, a barometric pressure of 957 mbar (28.3 inHg) was observed, the lowest known in relation to the storm. (Note: Another barometer nearby unofficially measured 28.10 inHg (952 mb).) Although it was expected to probably turn northward over the Florida peninsula and impact much of the southern portions of the East Coast of the United States, the storm continued on its northeastward trajectory. Around 00:00 UTC on October 12, the system weakened to a Category 2 hurricane and soon struck Grand Bahama and the Abaco Islands with winds of 105 mph (165 km/h). The system weakened to a Category 1 hurricane about six hours later. Late on October 12, the cyclone weakened to a tropical storm. About 24 hours later, it weakened to a tropical depression and subsequently dissipated 200 mi (320 km) northeast of Bermuda at 18:00 UTC on October 13.

== Preparations and impact ==
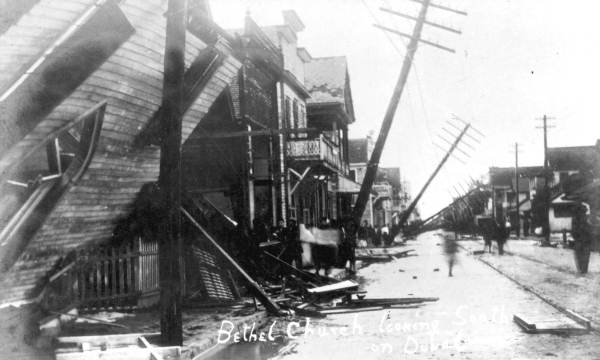
Damage in Key West along Duval Street

In western Cuba, strong winds and large waves left severe damage. The cities of Cayuco and La Fe in Pinar del Río Province were completely destroyed, while Guane experienced considerable devastation. Every house in Puerto Esperanza suffered damage due to strong winds. The Vuelta Abajo area, a prominent tobacco-growing region, suffered extensive flooding. Little damage occurred to tobacco crops, though oranges and other fruits experienced significant losses in portions of La Habana and Pinar del Río provinces. In Havana, the hurricane produced wind gusts as high as 130 mph (210 km/h). A number of small buildings were destroyed or deroofed. The tuberculosis hospital in the Arroyo Naranjo neighborhood was extensively damaged, injuring many patients. At the harbor, between 40 and 50 vessels were capsized or tossed ashore, including launches, lighters, and small tugboats. A total of five fatalities and about $1 million in damage occurred in that city alone. The large waves reached the coast of Mexico's Yucatán Peninsula, causing many fishermen and their families to drown.

Late on October 10, a "northeast storm warning" was issued along the entire Gulf Coast of Florida and to Mobile, Alabama, including Key West, Punta Rassa, Punta Gorda, Tampa, Rockwell, Cedar Key, Carrabelle, Apalachicola, Panama City, and Pensacola. Additionally, on the following day, Willis L. Moore, Chief of the United States Weather Bureau, telegraphed the signal office observers in Jacksonville, Jupiter, and Tampa, as well as in Thomasville, Georgia. Moore instructed the observers to warn residents of the approaching storm.

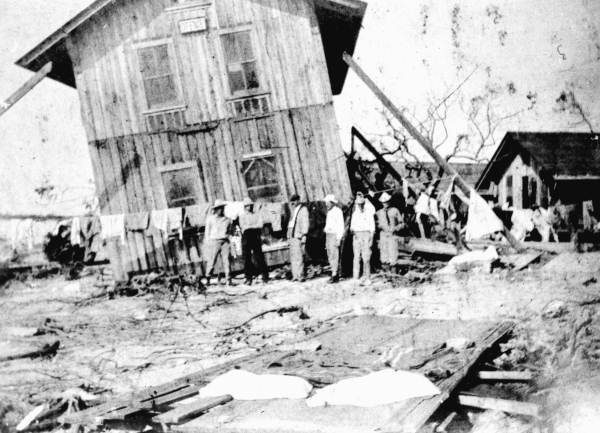
Damage in Marathon, Florida

In Key West, sustained winds reached 84 mph (135 km/h). The streets became a "mass of wreckage", with about half of the city described as virtually destroyed. Along Duval Street, telephone and light poles were downed due to high winds. Throughout the city, many frame buildings suffered some degree of damage. At least 500 homes were destroyed, as were seven churches and nine cigar factories, which were among the largest in the Southern United States. The storm demolished two engine houses at the fire department, causing the deaths of several horses and nearly killing firemen in the collapse. Additionally, the post office was damaged and the First National Bank was deroofed. In the vicinity of the island, hundreds of ships were wrecked. Overall, damage in Key West reached approximately $2 million. Newspapers initially noted a death toll around 800, with some reporting as many as 3,000 fatalities. However, this was later found to be greatly exaggerated. Two deaths occurred, both from fatal injuries during the storm. After the storm, Key West mayor Joseph N. Fogarty declared martial law, while guards were ordered to patrol the streets. The United States government was asked to send armed forces for additional policing.

At Sand Key, the Weather Bureau office was abandoned. The anemometer cups blew away, but sustained winds were estimated to have reached 100 mph (160 km/h). These winds also toppled the signal tower and all trees on the island. Waves inundated the entire island with at least 4 ft (1.2 m) of water, washing away the outhouses and eventually the Weather Bureau building. Two windows at the top of the lighthouse shattered. At Boca Chica and Sugarloaf keys, the camps for workers constructing the Florida East Coast Railway (FEC) were destroyed. Twelve deaths occurred at Bahia Honda Key after the tugboat Sybil wrecked there. In Marathon, the storm's eye lasted 1 1/4 hour and an anemometer clocked 110 mph (180 km/h) before being disabled. There the local timekeeper drowned. Overall, the death toll in the Florida Keys was much lower than during the 1906 hurricane – which killed hundreds – attributed to timely and effective warnings. The 1906 hurricane, this storm, and the 1910 hurricane each disrupted completion of the FEC. Nonetheless, the railroad was successfully extended to Key West in 1912.

In Miami, a number of homes, warehouses, and other buildings were deroofed, including the Masonic temple. The March Villa, a newly built hotel, suffered severe damage. Throughout the city, there were downed trees and sporadic damage reports. In the vicinity of Hallandale, three washouts occurred along the FEC, delaying the train for four hours. Deerfield experienced its heaviest rainfall event in years. Precipitation and the winds combined to destroy nearly all crops in the town. While passing through the Bahamas, the hurricane produced sustained winds of 50 mph (80 km/h) in Nassau, though no damage in the city was reported. Along the storm's entire path, 34 people were killed.

== See also ==
- List of Florida hurricanes (1900–1949)
- 1910 Cuba hurricane
- 1926 Havana–Bermuda hurricane
