= Straitsmouth Island Light =

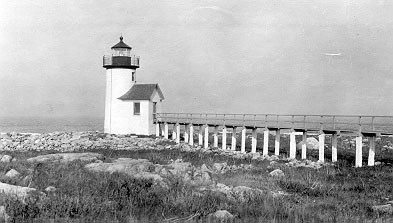
- USCG photo of the 1896 tower
- Location: Rockport, Massachusetts
- Coordinates: 42°39′44.14″N 70°35′17.05″W

Tower
- Constructed: 1835
- Foundation: Granite
- Construction: Brick / Asphalt
- Automated: 1967
- Height: 37 feet (11 m)
- Shape: Cylindrical
- Markings: White with black lantern
- Heritage: National Register of Historic Places listed place

Light
- First lit: 1835
- Focal height: 14 m (46 ft)
- Lens: 250 millimetres (9.8 in), solar powered
- Range: 6 nautical miles (11 km; 6.9 mi)
- Characteristic: Green, flashing every 6 sec
- Straightsmouth Island Light
- U.S. National Register of Historic Places
- Area: 1.8 acres (0.73 ha)
- Built: 1835
- Architectural style: Gothic
- MPS: Lighthouses of Massachusetts TR
- NRHP reference No.: 87001487
- Added to NRHP: June 15, 1987

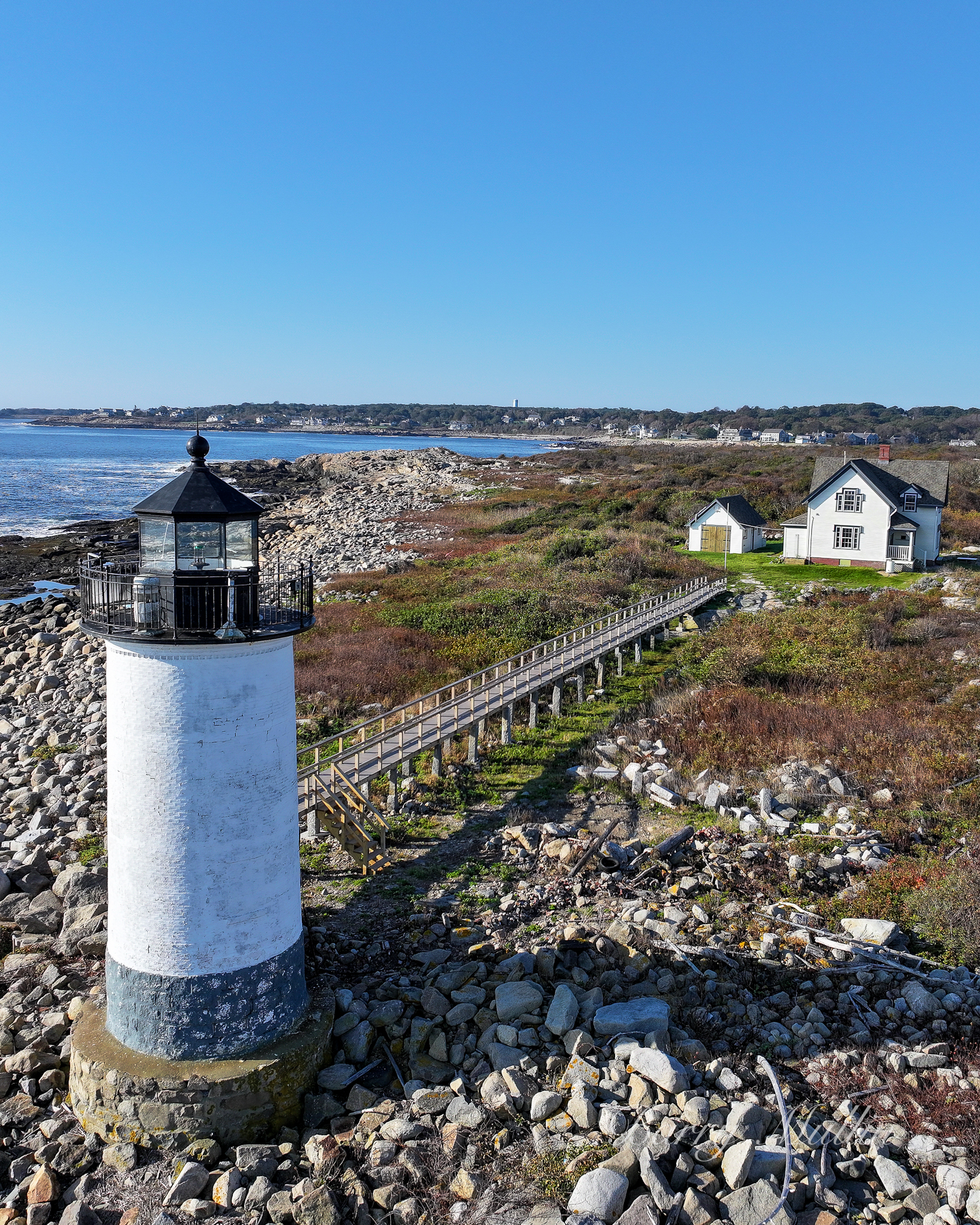
Straitsmouth Island Lighthouse on a beautiful morning in Rockport, MA, USA. (Drone Photography by Barry Mullin)

The Straitsmouth Island Light is a lighthouse located on Straitsmouth Island, in Rockport, Massachusetts. The original tower was built in 1835, and replaced by a second tower in 1896. It was automated in 1967, and is still in operation. The United States Coast Guard Light List description is "White cylindrical tower". The actual light is 46 feet (14 meters) above Mean High Water. The Light List name is "Straightsmouth Light", but the island is "Straitsmouth Island" on NOAA charts.

It was added to the National Register of Historic Places as the Straitsmouth Island Light in 1987.

Straitsmouth Island was owned for many years by the naval architect William Francis Gibbs and his wife, New York socialite and opera supporter, Vera Cravath Gibbs.

The island was left to the Massachusetts Audubon Society following the Gibbses' deaths in the 1960s.

== See also ==
- National Register of Historic Places listings in Essex County, Massachusetts
