= SS Langton Grange (1896) =

Coordinates: 51°54′14″N 5°22′35″W

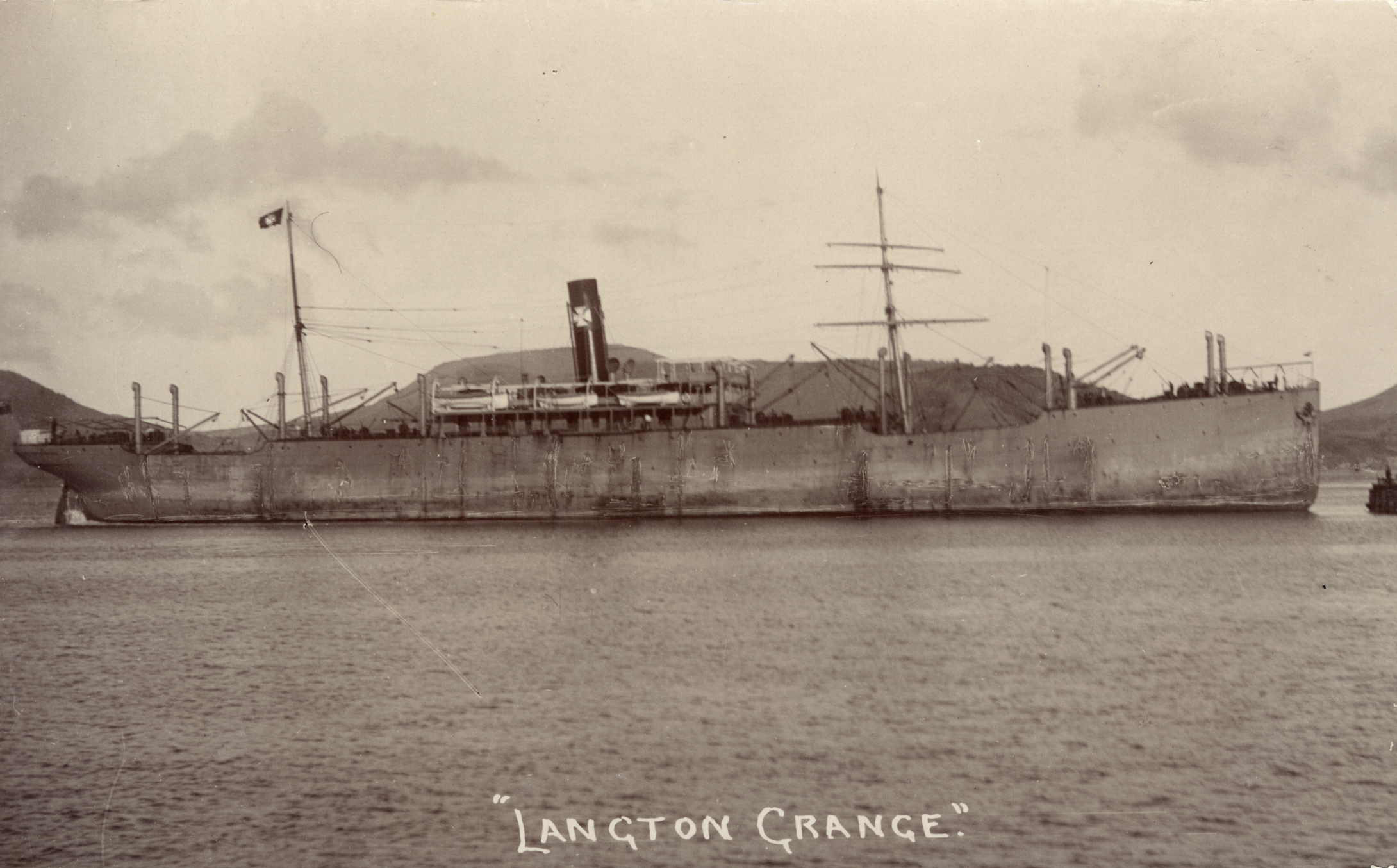

History

United Kingdom
- Name: Langton Grange
- Namesake: Langton
- Owner: Houlder Brothers & Co.
- Operator: Langton Grange Steam Ship Co. (1896-1899); Houlder Line (1899-1909)
- Builder: Workman, Clark & Co., Belfast
- Yard number: 124
- Launched: 29 February 1896
- Sponsored by: Mrs. Fred Houlder
- Commissioned: 27 May 1896
- Home port: London
- Identification: UK Official Number 105831; Call sign PHST
- Fate: Wrecked, 5 August 1909

General characteristics
- Type: Refrigerated Cargo Ship
- Tonnage: 5,803 GRT; 3,795 NRT; 9,100 DWT
- Length: 420 ft 0 in (128.02 m)
- Beam: 54 ft 2 in (16.51 m)
- Depth: 29 ft 5 in (8.97 m)
- Installed power: 568 Nhp
- Propulsion: Workman, Clark & Co. 3-cylinder triple expansion
- Speed: 12.0 knots (13.8 mph; 22.2 km/h)

Langton Grange was a refrigerated steam cargo ship built in 1896 by the Workman, Clark & Co. of Belfast for Houlder Brothers & Co. of London to transport meat and other produce from Australia and South America to United Kingdom.

== Design and construction ==
In mid-1890s, following continuous expansion of their frozen meat trade with Australia and South America, Houlder Brothers & Co. placed an order for three refrigerated cargo vessels of approximate 9,000 deadweight to increase the capacity of their fleet. Langton Grange was the first ship of the series and was laid down at Workman, Clark & Co. shipyard in Belfast and launched on 29 February 1896 (yard number 124), with Mrs. Fred Houlder of West Hampstead, being the sponsor.

The vessel was constructed according to the owners' requirements for general cargo trade with Australia, South America and South Africa. She had all the modern machinery fitted for quick loading and unloading of the cargo, including eleven powerful steam winches and a large number of derricks. The steamer had a capacity to carry over 700 heads of cattle on all decks. In addition, the ship was fitted with refrigerating machinery of the carbonic gas system and insulated chambers to carry chilled meat on her homeward journeys. Langton Grange had also accommodations built allowing her to carry a large number of first and second class passengers.

As built, the ship was 420 feet 0 inches (128.02 m) long (between perpendiculars) and 54 feet 2 inches (16.51 m) abeam, a mean draft of 29 feet 5 inches (8.97 m). Langton Grange was assessed at 5,803 GRT and 3,795 NRT and had deadweight of approximately 9,100. The vessel had a steel hull, and a single 568 nhp triple-expansion steam engine, with cylinders of 27-inch (69 cm), 44 1/2-inch (113 cm) and 74-inch (190 cm) diameter with a 54-inch (140 cm) stroke, that drove a single screw propeller, and moved the ship at up to 12.0 knots (13.8 mph; 22.2 km/h).

After successful completion of sea trials on 27 May 1896 on the Belfast Lough, during which the ship could easily maintain an average speed of 13 1/2 knots (15.5 mph; 25.0 km/h), she was transferred to her owners and immediately departed for Newport in the late afternoon.

== Operational history ==
Upon delivery Langton Grange departed Belfast for Newport in ballast on 27 May 1896. While at Newport, she loaded full cargo of coal and departed for her maiden voyage on 8 June for Cape Town reaching it on 5 July. From South Africa the vessel departed on 25 July for New Caledonia in ballast, however, she experienced some problems with her machinery en route, and had to put into Melbourne for repairs. Langton Grange left Melbourne on 2 September and took course to Thio where she loaded almost 4,000 tons of nickel ore and returned to Bowen and then Townsville on 24 September. The steamer loaded 4,186 bales of wool and about 700 tons of beef in Queensland ports before sailing to Sydney. There she took on board 166 bales of wool and 16,554 carcases of mutton and continued to Melbourne on 6 November. There she added 18,900 more carcasses of mutton and left for London via South America on 25 November.

While on her way to Buenos Aires, on 16 December Langton Grange lost three of her propeller blades and had her stern tube fractured and became disabled. In addition the coals in her bunkers caught fire and burned until her arrival in port damaging some of the cargo and insulation of the refrigerated chambers. She was sighted around Cape Horn on 24 December by steamer SS Wennington Hall who took her in tow and brought to Montevideo on 4 January, and from there Langton Grange was taken by two tugs to Buenos Aires. Once she arrived there, she had to unload most of her wool cargo and disembark all 16 passengers she had on board. After finalizing temporary repairs, the vessel departed Buenos Aires on 7 February 1897, stopped at Montevideo to load 561 bulls and 900 sheep, and reached London on 15 March, concluding her maiden journey.

Langton Grange conducted three more trips between the United Kingdom and Australia via South Africa and Buenos Aires in 1897-1899, bringing back frozen meat, wool and nickel ore. On 2 October 1898 she collided off Charleston with Norwegian barque Henrietta in the morning fog, and had her rails and bridge amidships damaged and had to return to London for repairs. While undergoing repairs, her second engineer slipped and fell into the water off the wharf on 18 October, and drowned.

Following the vessel's return to England in May 1899, she was chartered for one trip by the American & Australian Line, and departed Newport for New York on 17 July 1899. Upon arrival, she loaded general cargo, including among other things, 2,000 cases of kerosene, foodstuffs, and mining machinery for the Block 14 Silver Mining Company, and departed New York on 12 August arriving after an uneventful journey at Adelaide on 4 October. While en route, the ship was chartered by the Imperial Government to transport troops and horses to South Africa as tensions between the Boers and England had increased.

=== In the Imperial Government Service ===
During the month of October 1899, following her arrival in Australia, Langton Grange continued unloading her cargo at ports of Brisbane, Sydney and Melbourne. After several delays, the steamer took on board 2,500 cases of preserved meat, 688 horses and the remaining 60 men of the N.S.W. Mounted Rifles in addition to cargo of frozen meat bound for London, and departed Newcastle on 15 November. After arrival in South Africa, the Imperial Government bought out the whole frozen meat cargo of the vessel as provision for the army.

In January 1901 the steamer headed from South Africa to Buenos Aires to bring more horses for the army, however, her charter was cancelled, and she sailed from La Plata to England.

Remounts carried by Langton Grange to South Africa in 1899-1900
| Date of departure | Port of departure | Date of arrival | Port of arrival | No. of remounts embarked | Other cargo |
|---|---|---|---|---|---|
| 15 November 1899 | Newcastle | 14 December 1899 | Durban | 688 horses | 4,738 cases preserved meat, 590 tons beef, 536 bags bran, 30,000 carcasses mutton |
| 9 March 1900 | Newcastle | 7 April 1900 | Durban | 852 horses | 700 bags bran, 6280 bags chaff, 10,000 carcasses mutton, 1,700 boxes butter, 2,400 pieces beef |
| 18 July 1900 | New Orleans | 21 August 1900 | Port Elizabeth | 830 horses | 220 tons hay, 30 tons bran, 3,400 bushels oats |
| 18 September 1900 | Buenos Aires | 8 October 1900 | Port Elizabeth | 848 horses | fodder |
| 5 December 1900 | New Orleans | 11 January 1901 | Port Elizabeth | 832 horses | 200 tons hay, 75 tons bran, 4,687 bushels oats |

=== Return to Commercial Service ===
Upon arrival in England from South America, Langton Grange was again chartered by the American & Australian Line and left London for New York via Liverpool on 5 April 1901. After loading her cargo, consisting among other things of 50,375 cases of kerosene, and a large number of steel rails, the vessel sailed from New York on 25 May and reached Adelaide on 27 July. She encountered some rough weather on her way on 10 July flooding her passenger accommodations and stokehole and injuring 3 crew members. She made two more trips from Australia to Durban, in September 1901 and March 1902, carrying horses and provisions for the British army in an unofficial capacity, before returning to London on 3 June 1902. On leaving Broadmount on the night of 23 February 1902 the ship went aground on Mackenzie Island but was subsequently able to refloat herself without suffering any damage.

After the end of hostilities in South Africa, Langton Grange returned to her usual commercial activity. On 16 December 1902 while entering the port of Durban on her voyage from Buenos Aires with a cargo of frozen meat, she struck on breakwater and damaged her forehold and was brought into port with eight feet of water inside. Her cargo was transferred to steamer SS Maori King while she underwent temporary repairs and left Durban on 23 December for Buenos Aires.

During 1903 and through the first half of 1904 the ship continued carrying frozen meat and produce between Buenos Aires and South African ports. On 2 June 1904, while at Buenos Aires, the coal in her No. 9 hold got hot and about 300 tons of it had to be unloaded, but the vessel sustained no damage. Langton Grange proceeded then to Liverpool and arrived there on 19 July. After undergoing permanent repairs, she left Newport on 2 October to resume her trade. Once in Buenos Aires she took on board 100 Shorthorn bulls, 500 sheep and around 1,000 mules and horses and departed for South Africa on 13 December. While in Cape Town she loaded both damaged and undamaged cargo from SS Buteshire, including 1,700 tons of rails and 2,000 tons of agricultural machinery, and sailed for Australia on 26 February 1905. She arrived at Melbourne on 24 March, then continued to New Zealand where the vessel discharged most of her cargo. Subsequently, the ship was chartered by the Japanese Government to carry horses to Hong Kong and arrived in Sydney on 27 April, and continued to Townsville for loading. She finished loading 1,093 horses on 11 May and departed the next day. Instead of Hong Kong, she unloaded her cargo at Ujina and departed for her return trip to Australia on 6 June carrying on board 56 officers and crew of steamer SS Courtfield. As Japan was at war with Russia at the time, the cargo may have been considered contraband had the ship run into a Russian navy ship on her journey.

For the remainder of 1905 and through early 1908 Langton Grange continued mostly trade on the New York-Australia-England route under auspices of American & Australian Line, carrying general cargo from North America, and frozen meat and produce, wool and other general cargo from Australia. From 1908 the vessel returned to England-Australia via South Africa route carrying the same type of cargo.

=== Sinking ===
Langton Grange left Liverpool for her final voyage on 6 February 1909 and reached Melbourne on 26 March. She carried a large cargo for New Zealand and almost 250 immigrants for Australia. After disembarking her passengers and unloading part of her cargo in Australian ports, she continued to New Zealand and arrived at Auckland on 7 April. The ship then spent more than two months unloading her cargo and loading a cargo of frozen meat, cereals and other general cargo at various ports of New Zealand before departing Lyttelton on 31 May for Avonmouth. After a long but uneventful journey the vessel arrived at her destination on 16 July. After discharging part of her cargo, she proceeded first to Liverpool and then to Glasgow arriving there on 1 August.

Langton Grange departed Glasgow for Newport in ballast around 01:00 on 4 August 1909. She was under command of captain F. Ashley Graves and had a crew of 54. At 04:00 she dropped off a pilot at Greenock and proceeded south at full speed. The weather was hazy and the captain set the course straight for the South Bishop Lighthouse. At about 01:20 on 5 August the Strumble Head Lighthouse was sighted on the port side. Recognizing that the vessel was heading too far into Cardigan Bay, the captain altered the course, but the haze soon masked the lighthouse and no more adjustments were possible. Using his observations and estimating the speed of the steamer to be 13 knots, captain Graves calculated the ship's distance from the lighthouse to be around 5 1/2 miles, which given the conditions was mostly likely erroneous. At around 02:15, soon after spotting the South Bishop Lighthouse, the vessel struck submerged Bell Rock, just off North Bishop Island and got stranded. The ship started leaking immediately, and her No. 1, No.2 and No.3 holds, stokehold and engine room quickly filled with water. At about 08:00 a lifeboat came by from St David's offering assistance and inquiring about the well-being of the crew, but the captain declined the help at that time. Steamer SS Sussex arrived at the scene at approximately 14:00 and took on board 31 crew members and delivered them to Fishguard in the evening.

On 6 August the situation deteriorated, as the vessel started to break up amidships. In addition, hold No.5 had also filled with water, and No. 4 hold started filling up. Another steamer, SS Vigilant came by and took the remaining 22 men including the captain and landed them safely onshore on 7 August when it became clear the ship cannot be saved. The next day the after body sank about 6 feet and salvage attempts commenced. On 9 August the vessel developed a list to starboard and showed more signs of breaking up. Finally, on 10 August the ship parted just in front of boiler space with after body sinking, and the fore part staying up horizontally. The salvors removed gear that could be saved and returned to Milford.

An inquiry into the wrecking was held on 18–20 September 1909 and the court found the captain was at fault for relying too much on the approximate distance from the Strumble Head Light, which likely was inaccurate in a foggy weather at the time of disaster. Additionally, the captain tried to navigate a fine course without regard to the strong tides and currents present in the area. Captain Graves was severely censured but did not lose his license.
