= 1909 Atlantic hurricane season =

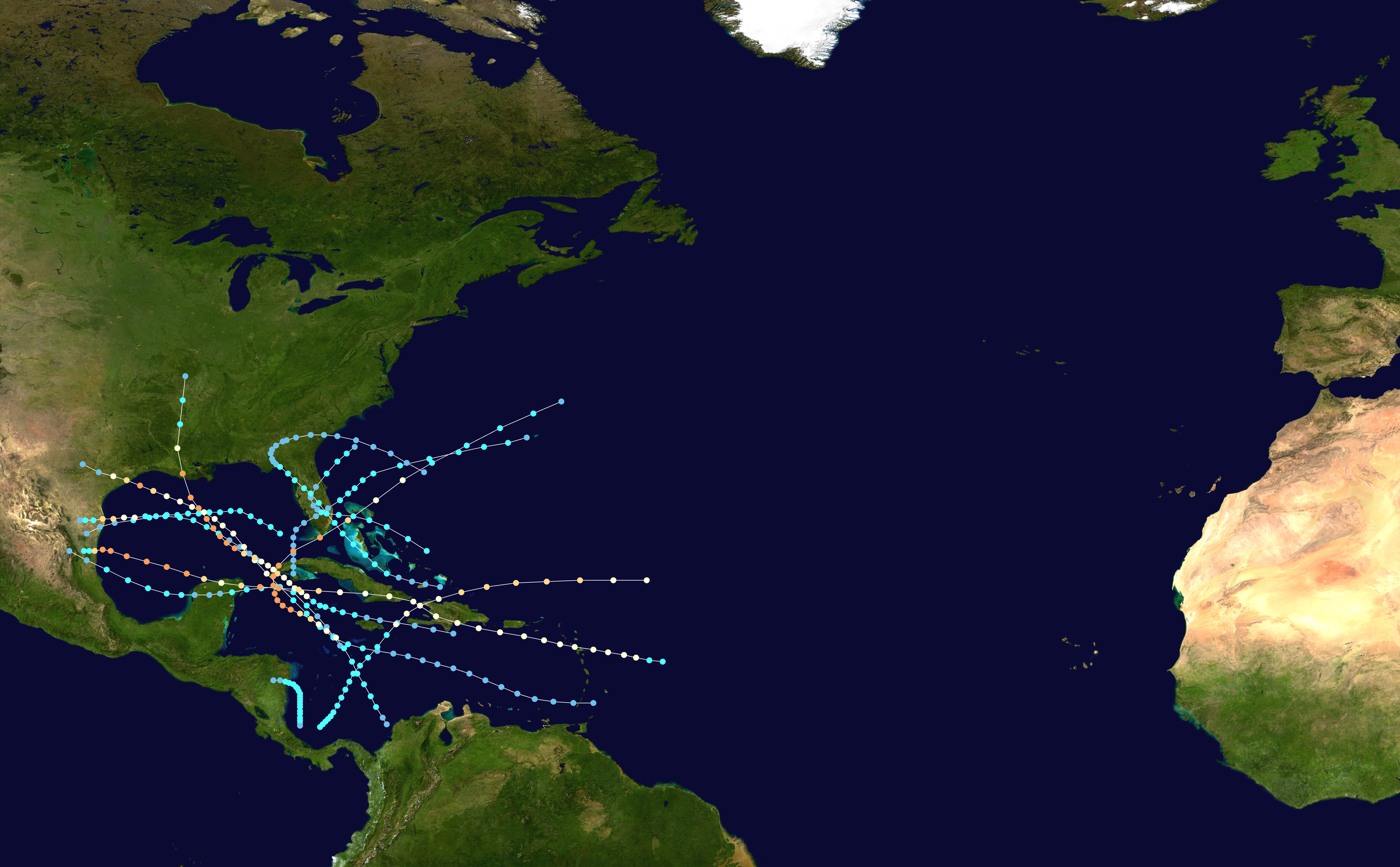
- Season summary map

Seasonal boundaries
- First system formed: June 15, 1909
- Last system dissipated: November 14, 1909

Strongest storm
- Name: Grand Isle
  - Maximum winds: 120 mph (195 km/h) (1-minute sustained)
  - Lowest pressure: 952 mbar (hPa; 28.11 inHg)

Seasonal statistics
- Total depressions: 13
- Total storms: 12
- Hurricanes: 6
- Major hurricanes (Cat. 3+): 4
- Total fatalities: 4,673
- Total damage: $77.3 million (1909 USD)

Related articles
- 1900–09 Pacific hurricane seasons; 1902-19 Pacific typhoon seasons; 1900s North Indian Ocean cyclone seasons

The 1909 Atlantic hurricane season was an average Atlantic hurricane season. The season produced thirteen tropical cyclones, twelve of which became tropical storms; six became hurricanes, and four of those strengthened into major hurricanes. The season's first storm developed on June 15 while the last storm transitioned into an extratropical cyclone on November 14. The most notable storm during the season formed in late August, while east of the Lesser Antilles. The hurricane devastated the Lesser Antilles, the Greater Antilles, and Mexico, leaving around 4,000 fatalities and more than $50 million (1909 USD) in damage.

The 1909 season was very deadly and destructive, featuring at least 4,673 fatalities, and $77.3 million in damage, mostly due to the sixth and eighth hurricanes of the season. In mid-July, the fourth storm of the season hit Freeport, Texas, as a Category 3 hurricane, killing 41 people, and causing $2 million in damage. In mid-September, the ninth storm of the season made landfall near Grand Isle, Louisiana, as a Category 3 hurricane, killing at least 350 people and causing $10 million in damage. The storm's storm surge is responsible for destroying thousands of homes, as it penetrated 2 mi (3.2 km) inland. In mid-October, the eleventh storm of the season developed, and tracked across Cuba, the Florida Keys, and the Bahamas as a Category 3 hurricane. At least $2 million in damage was caused, and at least 22 deaths were recorded. Lastly, the final storm of the season struck eastern Jamaica and Hispaniola as a hurricane before transitioning into an extratropical cyclone northeast of the Bahamas. The storm killed 198 people, and caused $7 million in damage.

== Season summary ==
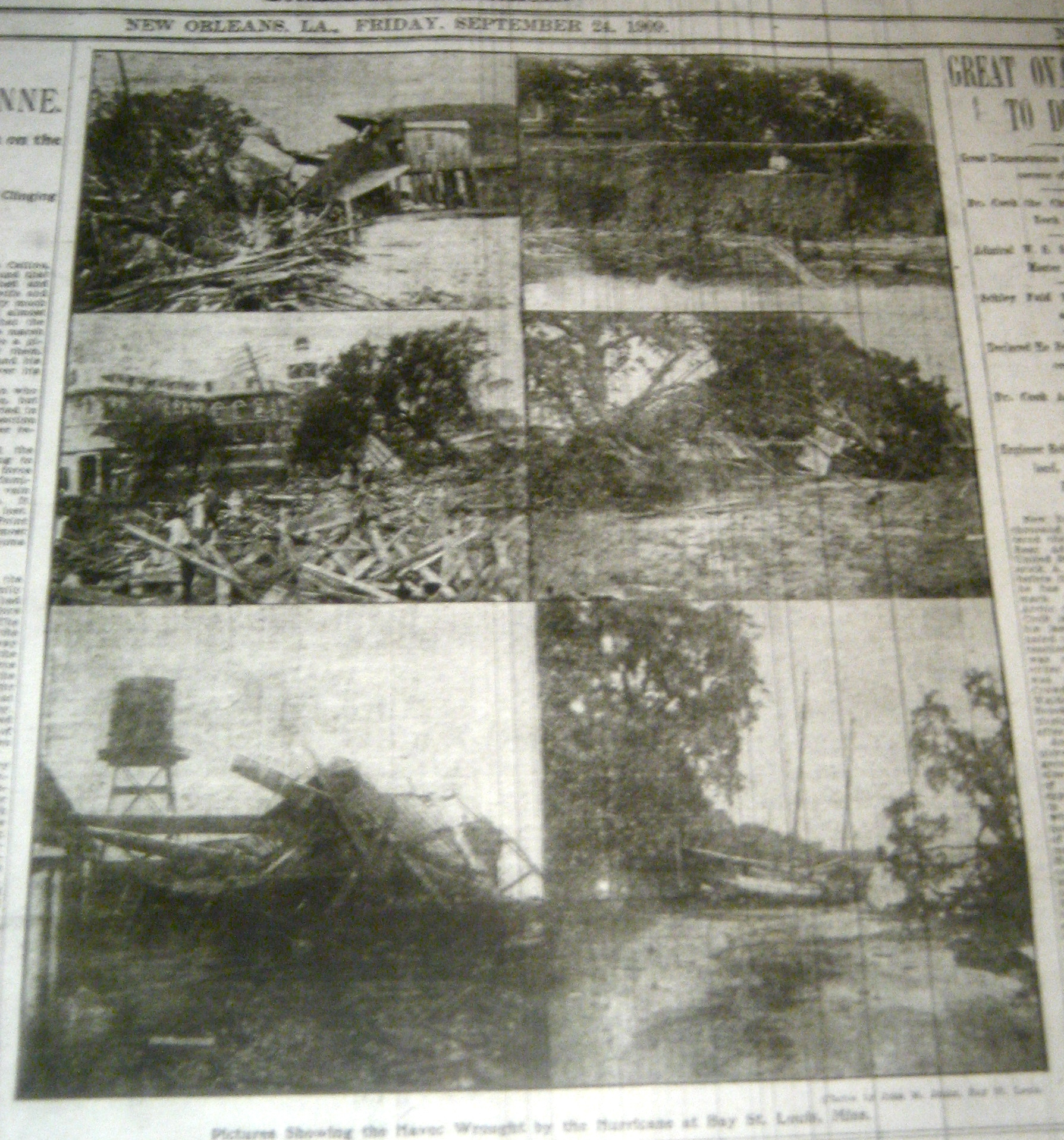
Damage caused by the Grand Isle hurricane in Bay St. Louis, Mississippi

Tropical cyclogenesis began on or shortly before June 15, when the first system was initially detected in the southwestern Caribbean. The month of June featured two other storms. One cyclone formed in July, the Velasco hurricane. August was the most active month, with four tropical storms, including the Monterrey hurricane. There were two systems in September. The former, the Grand Isle hurricane, was the most intense tropical cyclone of the season, peaking with maximum sustained winds of 120 mph (195 km/h) and a minimum barometric pressure of 952 mbar (28.1 inHg). October and November each featured one storm, the Florida Keys hurricane and the Greater Antilles hurricane, respectively. The twelfth and final cyclone of the season, the Greater Antilles hurricane transitioned into an extratropical cyclone over the Atlantic Ocean to the northeast of the Lesser Antilles on November 14.

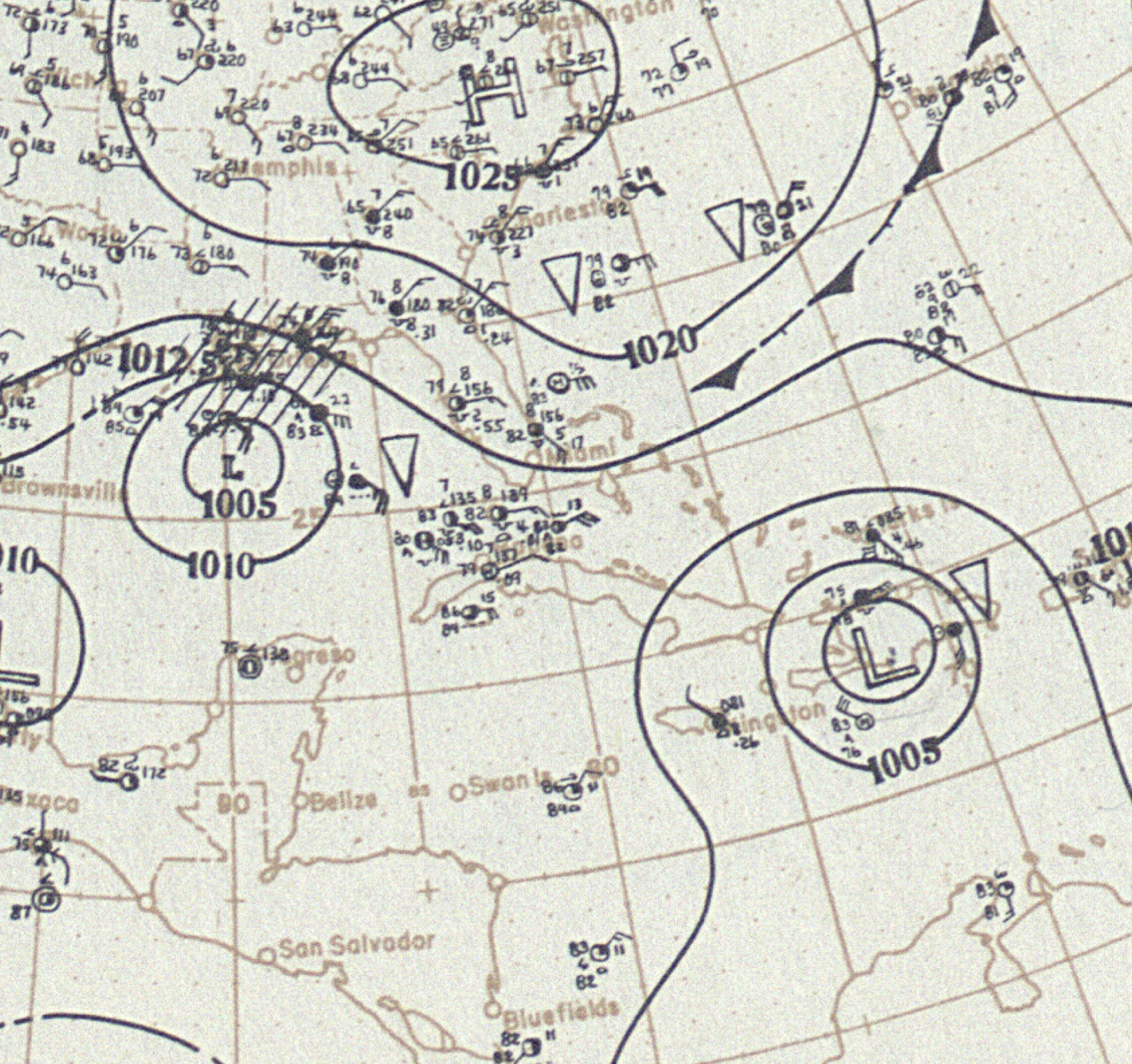
Weather map on August 23, showing two tropical cyclones active, one storm over Hispaniola, and the second storm over the Gulf of Mexico

The season had a total of 12 tropical storms, 6 of which intensified into a hurricane. This was the most tropical storms in a season since the total of 13 in 1901. The reanalysis from Christopher Landsea et al. in 2011 resulted in the addition of two tropical storms, which are listed as the first and seventh storms. In 1999, José F. Partagás and Henry F. Diaz uncovered evidence confirming the existence of a tropical system in November, while Landsea et al. upgraded the system from a tropical storm to a Category 2 hurricane on the modern day Saffir–Simpson hurricane wind scale. Additionally, the second storm of the second was also upgraded to a hurricane, increasing the number of landfalling hurricanes in the United States to five, the most in a season since 1893. All of the season's 12 tropical storms made landfall. Collectively, the storms caused over $77.3 million in damage and at least 4,673 fatalities.

The season's activity was reflected with an accumulated cyclone energy (ACE) rating of 93. ACE is a metric used to express the energy used by a tropical cyclone during its lifetime. Therefore, a storm with a longer duration will have high values of ACE. It is only calculated at six-hour increments in which specific tropical and subtropical systems are either at or above sustained wind speeds of 39 mph (63 km/h), which is the threshold for tropical storm intensity. Thus, tropical depressions are not included here.

== Systems ==
=== Tropical Storm One ===
- Tropical storm (SSHWS)
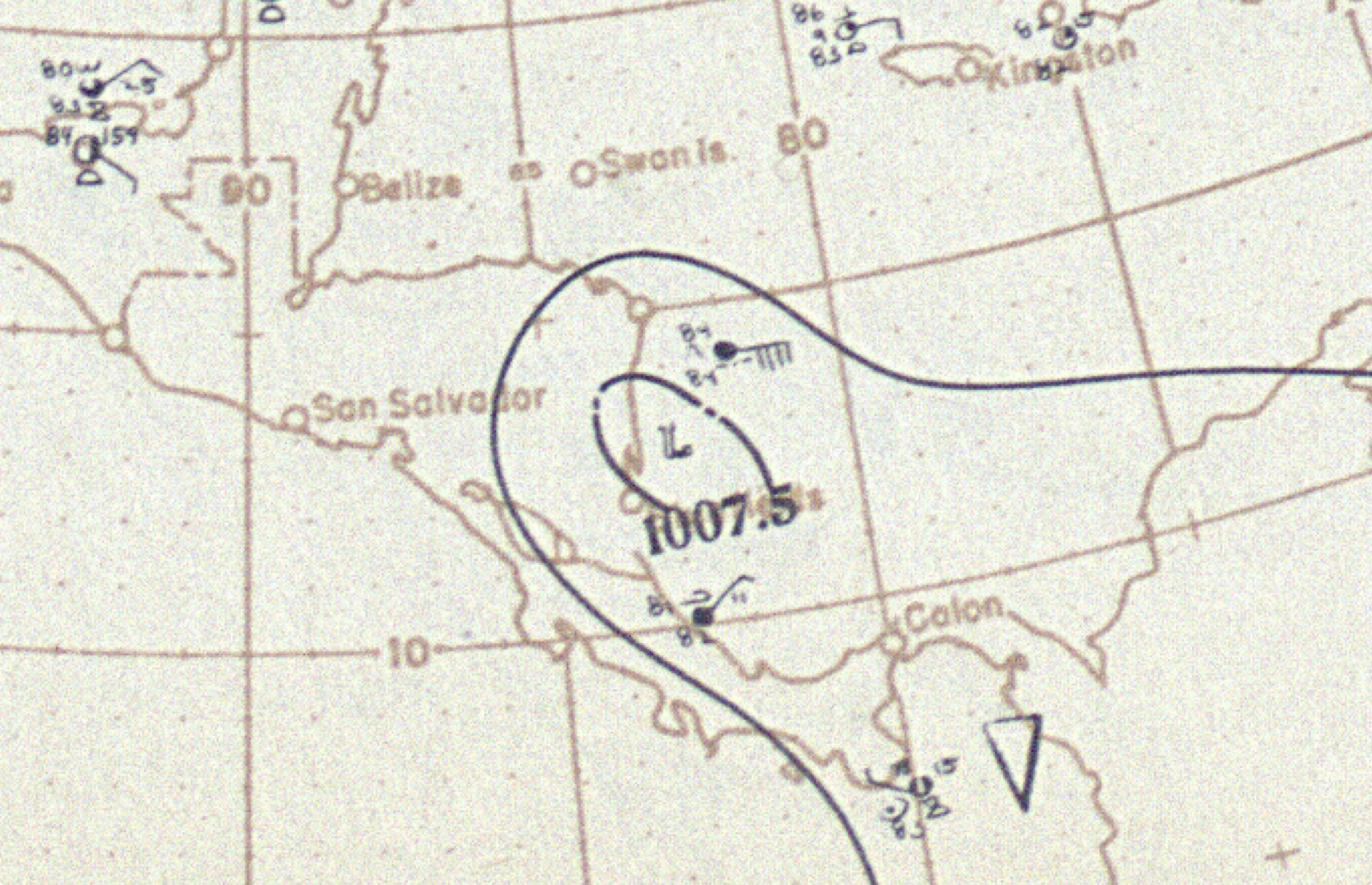
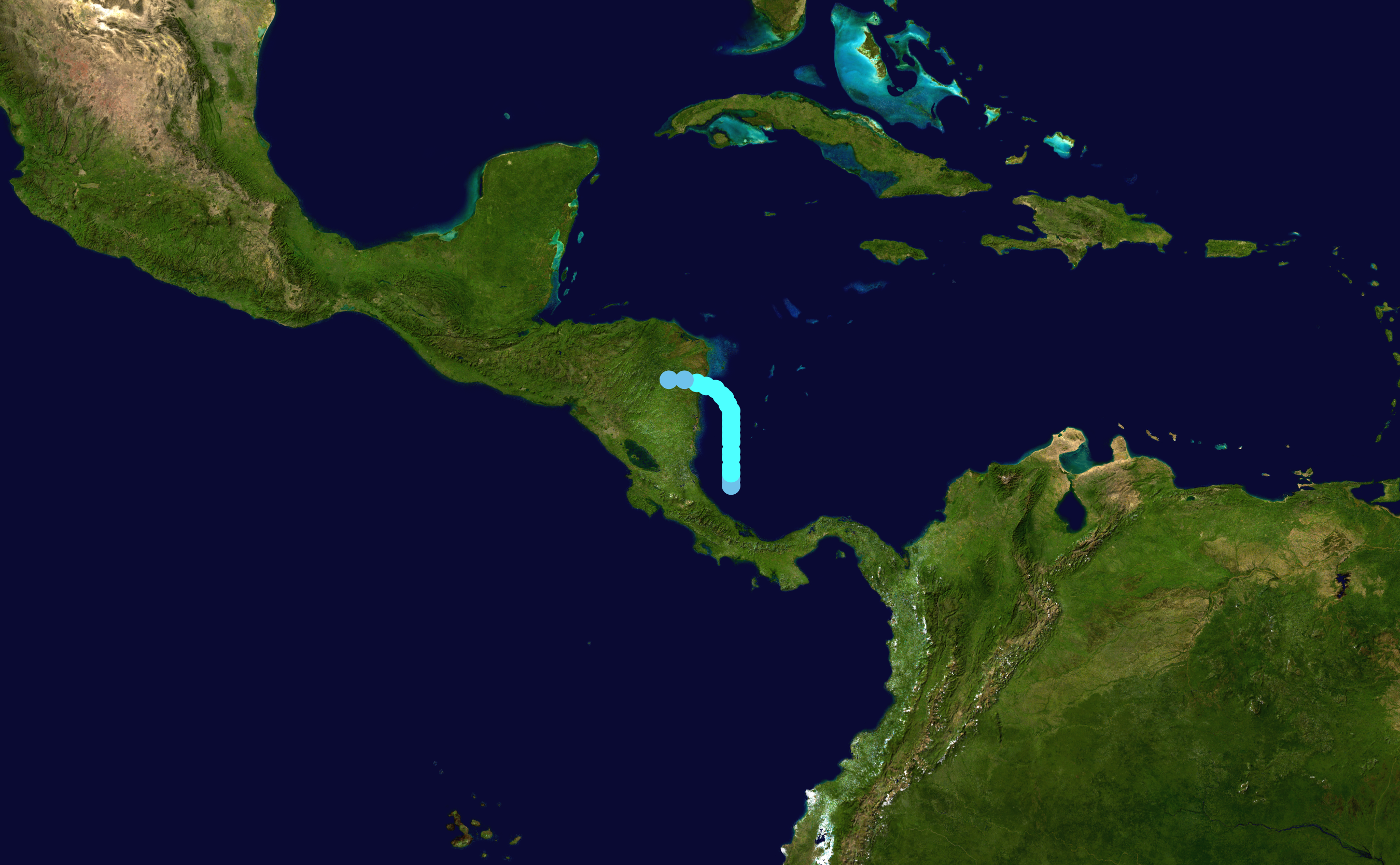
- Duration: June 15 – June 19
- Peak intensity: 45 mph (75 km/h) (1-min); 1009 mbar (hPa)

The first tropical cyclone of the season was first identified as a tropical depression near the southeastern Nicaragua coastline on June 15. Tracking due north, the depression intensified into a tropical storm within 12 hours. Operationally, this system was not classified as a tropical storm as there was uncertainty of tropical storm-force winds being measured. Maintaining a slow, northward movement, the system attained peak winds of 45 mph (75 km/h). On June 18, it gradually turned towards the west, leading to the storm making landfall near Puerto Cabezas, Nicaragua, the following morning. Once overland, the storm weakened, first to a tropical depression before dissipating near the Nicaragua-Honduras border during the evening of June 19. Due to the weak nature of the system, little information was recorded on it. Throughout its existence, ships in the region suggested a minimum pressure of 1009 mbar (hPa; 29.80 inHg).

=== Hurricane Two ===
- Category 2 hurricane (SSHWS)
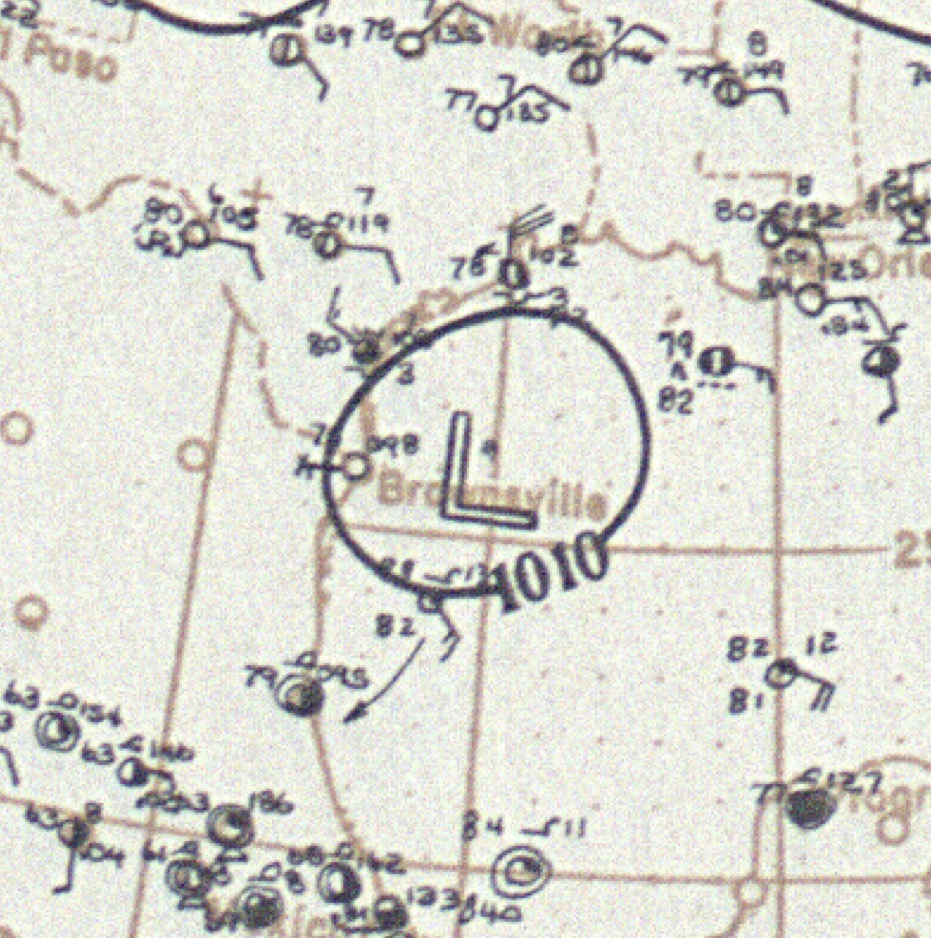
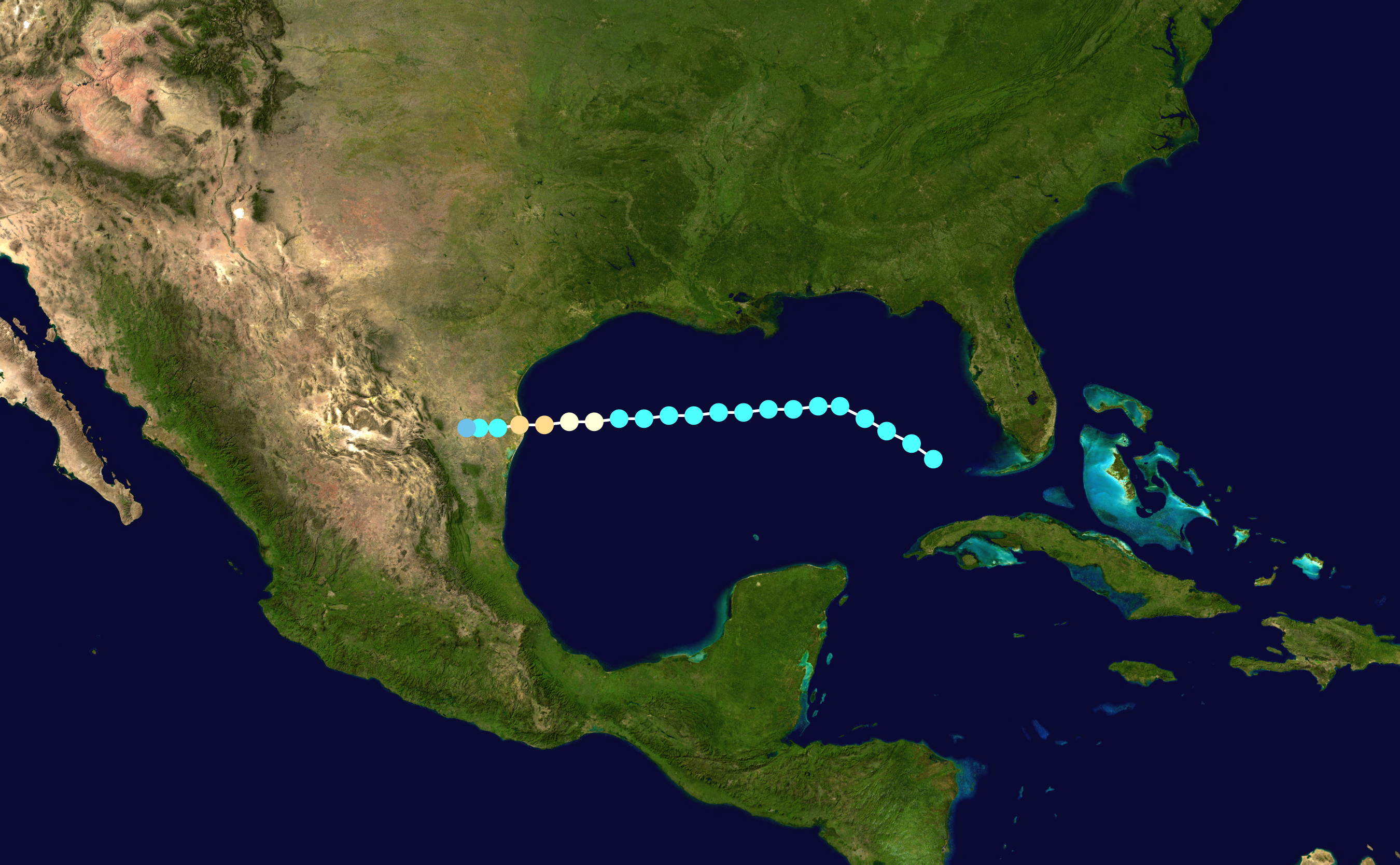
- Duration: June 25 – June 30
- Peak intensity: 100 mph (155 km/h) (1-min); 972 mbar (hPa)

In late June, the season's second tropical cyclone developed near the Florida Keys. Its origins are unknown and the first indications of the system were as a tropical storm. After tracking northwest towards Louisiana for about a day. The system sharply changed direction and took a direct path towards the south Texas coastline. By June 29, it was estimated that the storm intensified into a minimal hurricane, attaining winds of 75 mph (120 km/h). However, reanalysis on the storm by Partagás in 1999 indicated that it was only a tropical storm. Shortly before the hurricane made landfall near Brownsville, Texas, it attained its peak intensity as a modern-day Category 2 cyclone with winds of 100 mph (155 km/h). A barometric pressure of 972 mbar (hPa; 28.70 inHg) was recorded as the storm moved inland. By June 30, the system weakened to a tropical storm and crossed into northern Mexico; the cyclone dissipated several hours later.

Upon making landfall, the hurricane brought a storm surge exceeding 5 ft (1.5 m), inundating low-lying coastal areas such as Padre Island. Winds up to 48 mph (77 km/h) were recorded as far north as Corpus Christi; however, no known winds were measured where the system made landfall. During a 24‑hour span, 10 in (250 mm) of rain fell in Mercedes, Texas. These heavy rains resulted in substantial flooding along the Rio Grande over the following week. Near Brownsville, a town in Mexico was mostly flooded after the river broke its banks on July 4. Floods persisted in the country through July 10, leaving behind substantial damage. Though no loss of life took place, total losses from the hurricane reached $1.3 million, almost all of which was attributed to destroyed railroads in Mexico.

=== Tropical Storm Three ===
- Tropical storm (SSHWS)
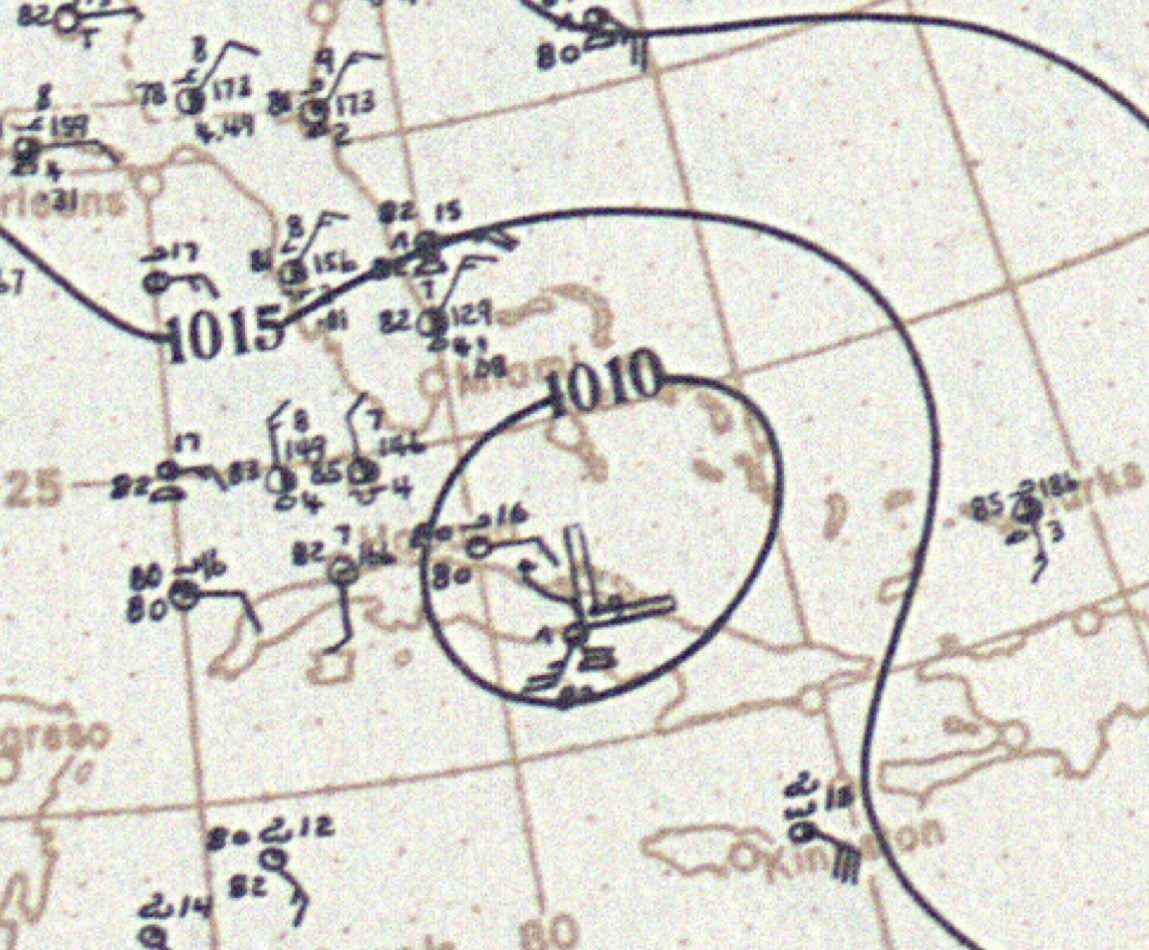
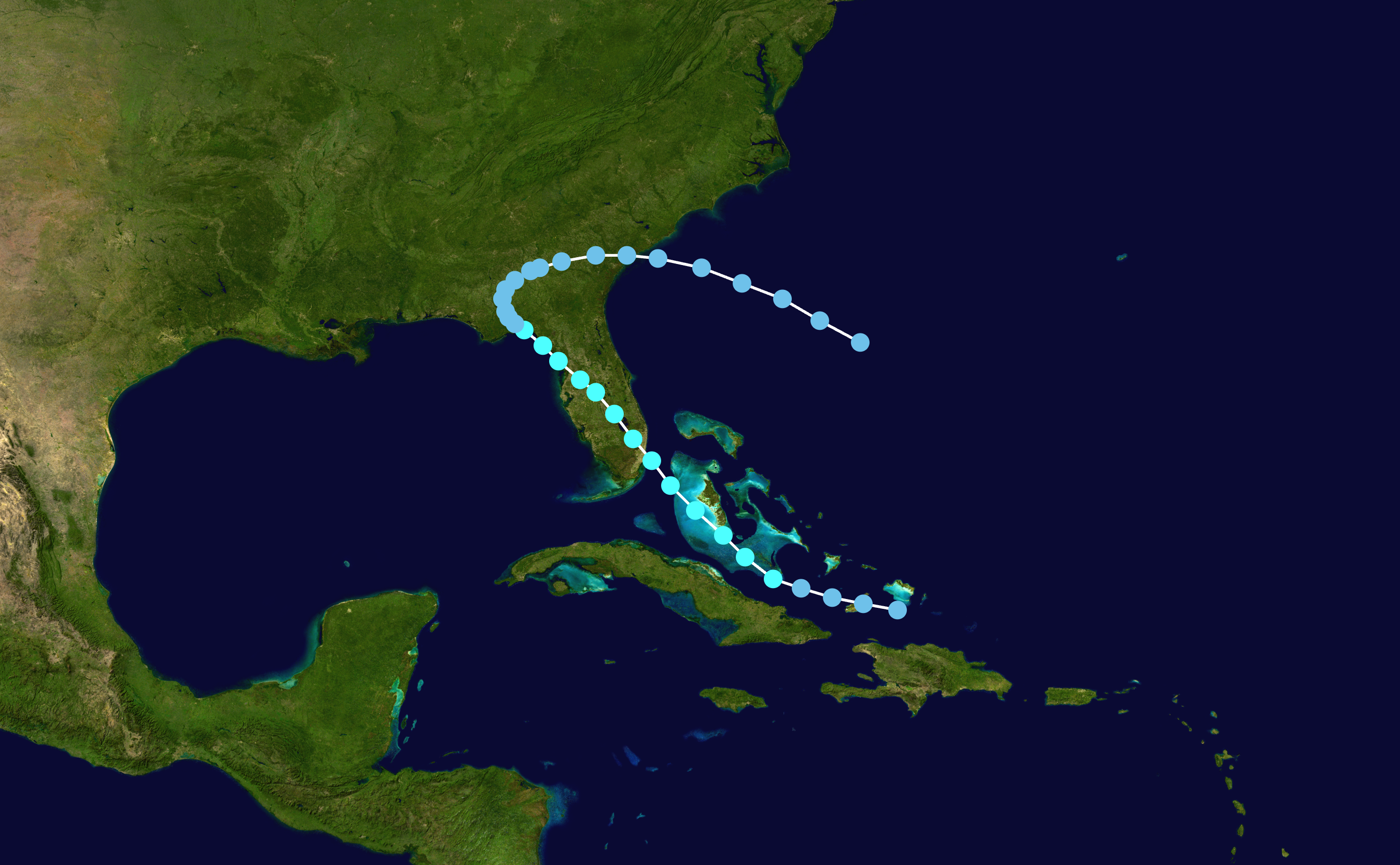
- Duration: June 26 – July 4
- Peak intensity: 50 mph (85 km/h) (1-min); <1005 mbar (hPa)

A tropical depression developed near Turks and Caicos Islands on June 26; moving west-northwestward, the depression struck Great Inagua Island in the Bahamas. By 12:00 UTC the following day, the storm curved northwestward and strengthened into a tropical storm. While situated near Andros around 12:00 UTC on June 28, the cyclone peaked with winds of 50 mph (85 km/h). About eight hours later, it made landfall near Fort Lauderdale, Florida. The storm emerged into the Gulf of Mexico near Cedar Key early on June 30, before making landfall near St. Marks close to 14:00 UTC with winds of 40 mph (65 km/h). Although the system quickly weakened to a tropical depression, it remained a tropical cyclone while moving in a semicircular path across the Southeastern United States. Early on July 3, the storm emerged into the Atlantic near Beaufort, South Carolina. Around this time, Charleston observed a barometric pressure of 1,005 mbar (29.7 inHg), the lowest in relation to the system. The storm moved east-southeastward and continued weakening, until dissipating between Bermuda and Grand Bahama late on July 4.

In Florida, the storm brought heavy rainfall to some areas. There was standing water on the streets of Bartow and Lakeland. In Tampa, winds exceeding 30 mph (48 km/h) shattered some windows. There was also "considerable" impact to crops and telegraph and telephone wires. Along the coast, several small crafts were damaged.

=== Hurricane Four ===
- Category 3 hurricane (SSHWS)
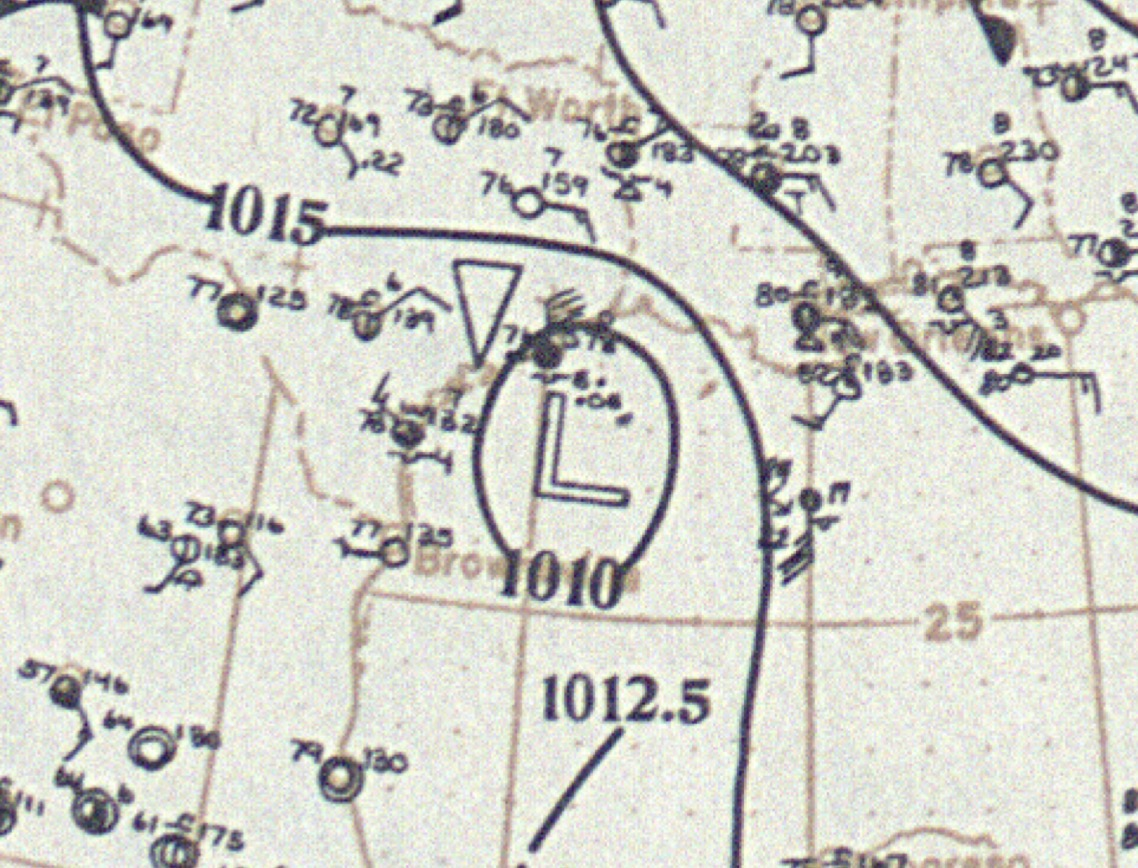
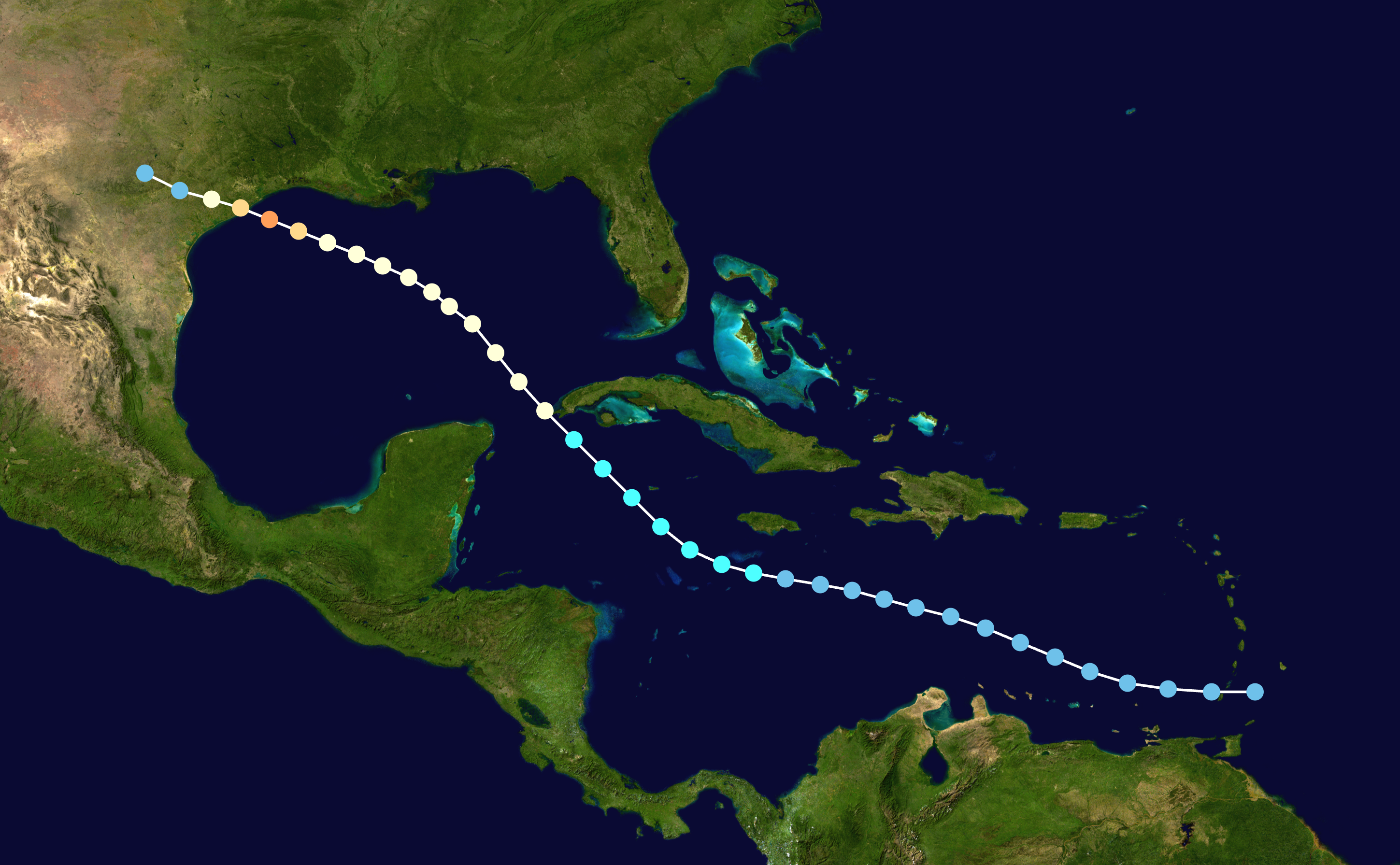
- Duration: July 13 – July 22
- Peak intensity: 115 mph (185 km/h) (1-min); 959 mbar (hPa)

The Velasco Hurricane of 1909

A tropical depression was first noted in close proximity to the Windward Islands on July 13. Remaining weak for the next few days, the system began to intensify after nearing Jamaica on July 17, when it became a tropical storm. Curving towards the northwest, the cyclone reached hurricane strength on July 18 near the western tip of Cuba. Intensification halted as it moved westwards across the Gulf of Mexico, but resumed as the hurricane approached the Texas coast. The storm deepened into a Category 3 hurricane on July 21 and subsequently reached its peak intensity with winds of 115 mph (185 km/h). Shortly thereafter, the hurricane made landfall near Velasco, Texas. Once over land, the system began to quickly weaken, and dissipated near the Rio Grande on July 22.

In Cuba, the storm brought rough seas, strong winds, and persistently heavy rainfall over a period of two days, inundating the streets of Batabanó with about 3 ft (0.91 m) of water. A number of vessels also sank, but no fatalities occurred. In Texas, strong waves caused several offshore shipping incidents, and storm surge inundated areas of the Texas coast, though damage in Galveston was mostly mitigated by the Galveston Seawall. In Velasco, one of the hardest hit cities, only eight buildings remained intact after the hurricane. Strong winds forced train closures and destroyed and downed various infrastructure. Heavy rains further inland peaked at 8.5 in (220 mm) in Hallettsville. The hurricane caused 41 deaths and $2 million in damages in Texas.

=== Tropical Storm Five ===
- Tropical storm (SSHWS)
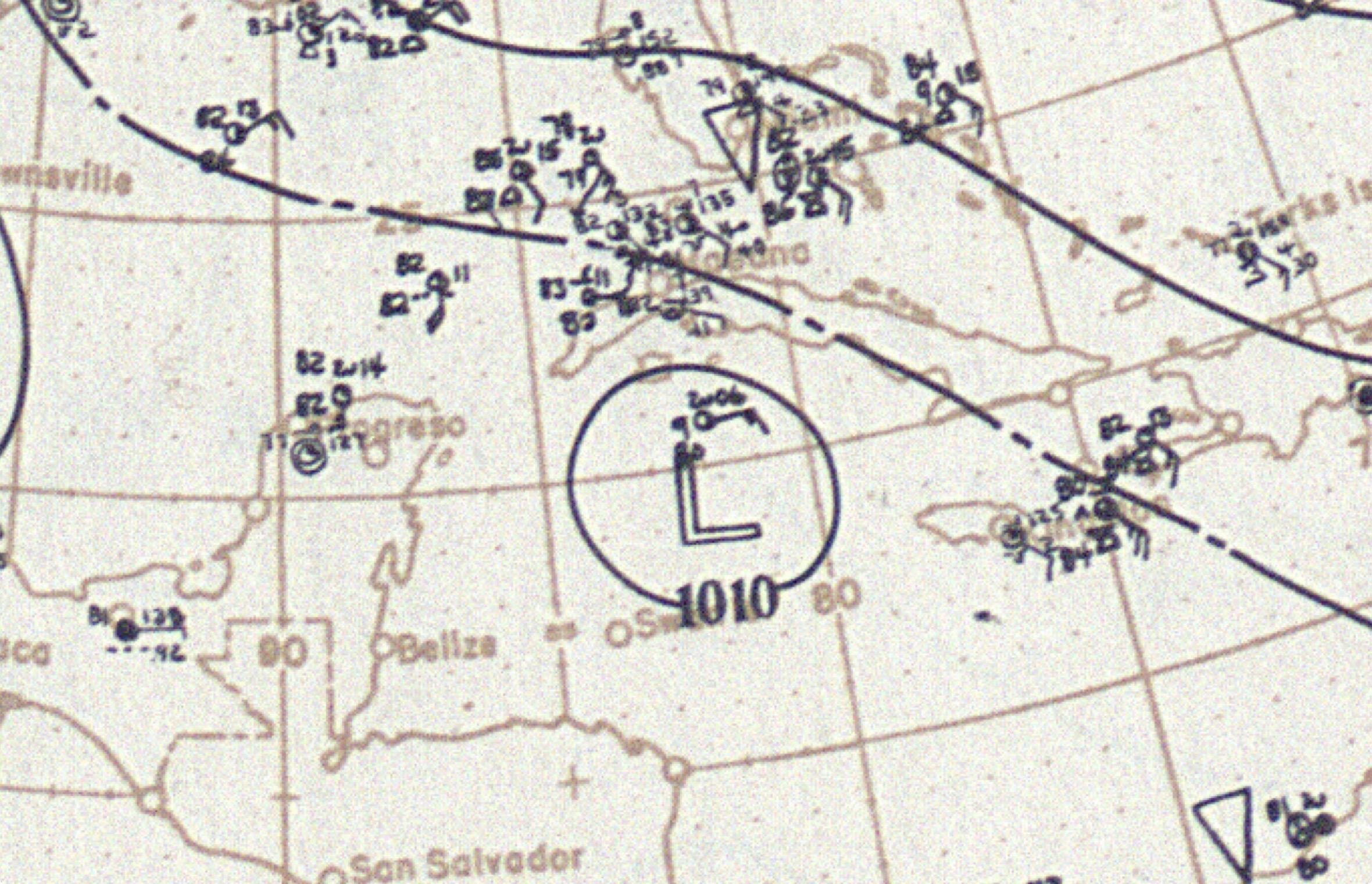
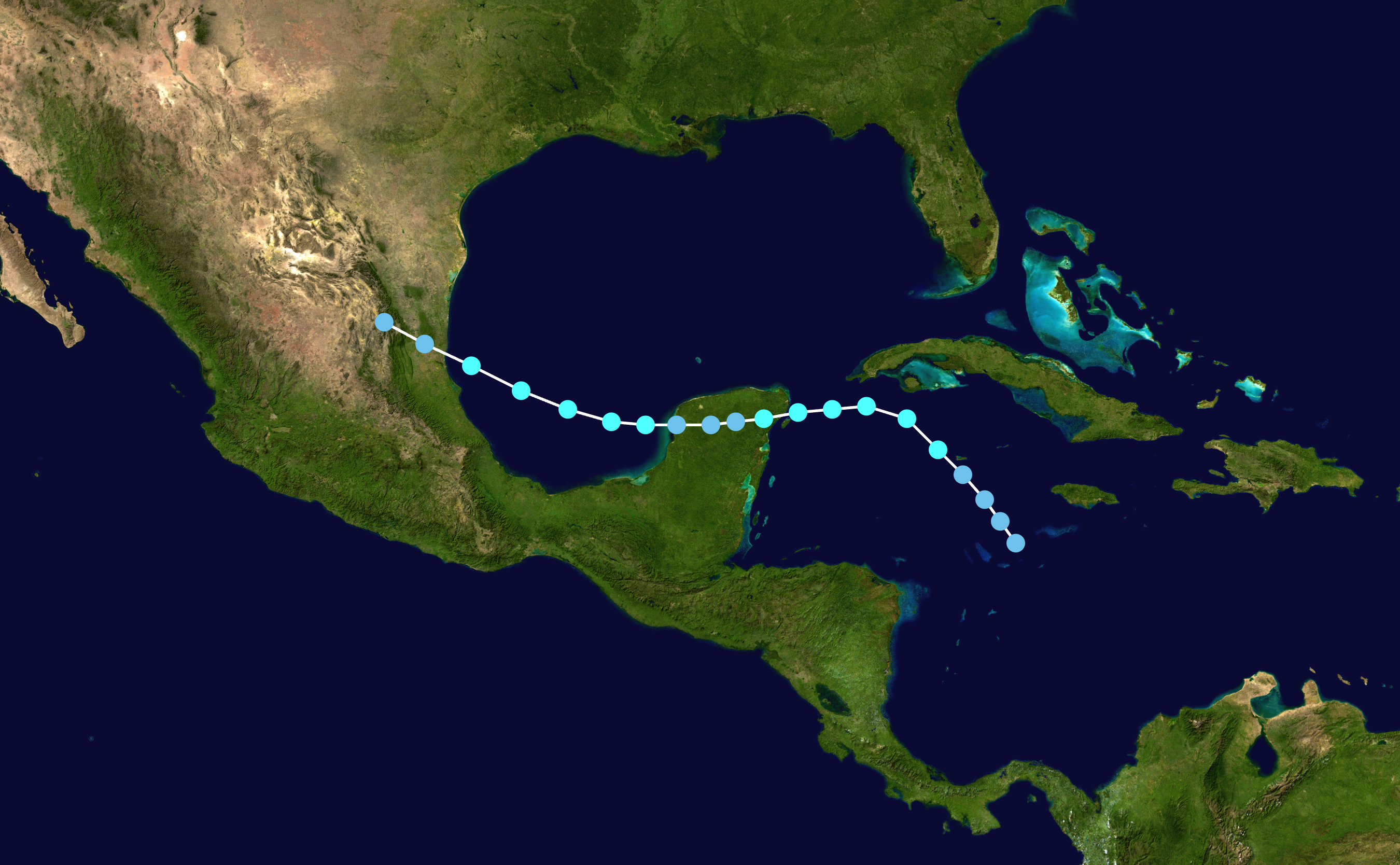
- Duration: August 6 – August 10
- Peak intensity: 45 mph (75 km/h) (1-min); 1004 mbar (hPa)

On August 6, a new tropical depression was identified between Jamaica and Honduras. Tracking northwestward, the system gradually intensified, attaining tropical storm status near the Cayman Islands later that day. On August 7, the storm turned towards the west and reached its peak intensity just off the coast of the Yucatán Peninsula with winds of 45 mph (75 km/h) and a pressure of 1004 mbar (hPa; 29.65 inHg). Hours later, the cyclone made landfall near Cancún and weakened to a tropical depression hours later. Continuing westward, the system moved back over water on August 9, over the Bay of Campeche. Within hours of doing so, it re-attained tropical storm status as its forward motion quickly increased. During the afternoon of August 10, the storm made its final landfall near Tampico, Tamaulipas, before rapidly dissipating over the mountainous terrain of Mexico later that day.

=== Tropical depression ===
A tropical depression formed southwest of the Capo Verde Islands on August 7. A nearby ship recorded winds of 52 mph (84 km/h) and a barometric pressure of 1,004 mbar (29.6 inHg) later that day. Thus, the depression may have intensified into a tropical storm. However, due to sparse data, it is unclear if the depression remained a tropical cyclone over the next several days as it tracked westward. The presence of a closed circulation on August 14 and August 18 was confirmed by historic weather maps. On the latter date, the depression again may have strengthened into a tropical storm, though data from the ship observing tropical storm-force winds may have been unreliable. No evidence of a closed circulation exists beyond August 18, and thus, the depression likely dissipated.

=== Hurricane Six ===
- Category 3 hurricane (SSHWS)
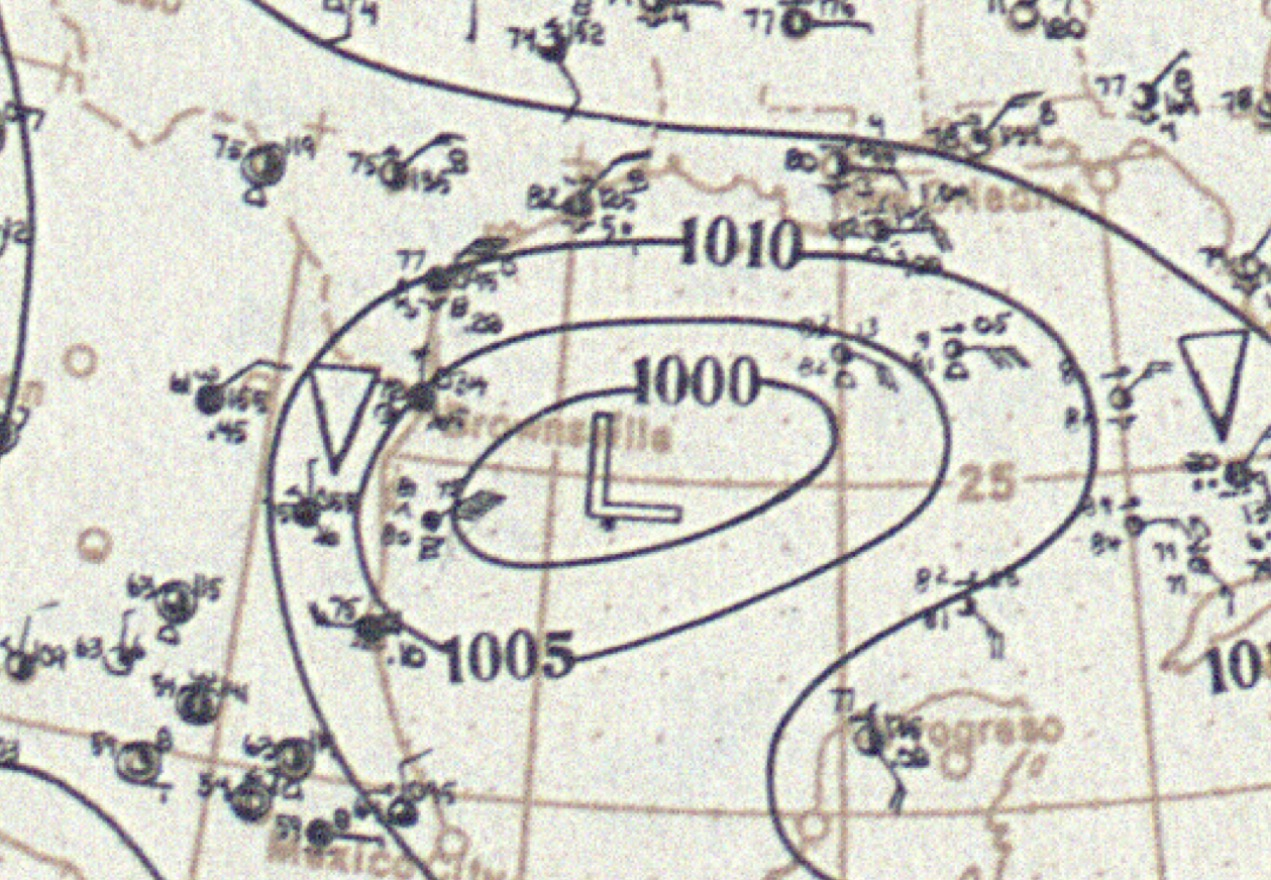
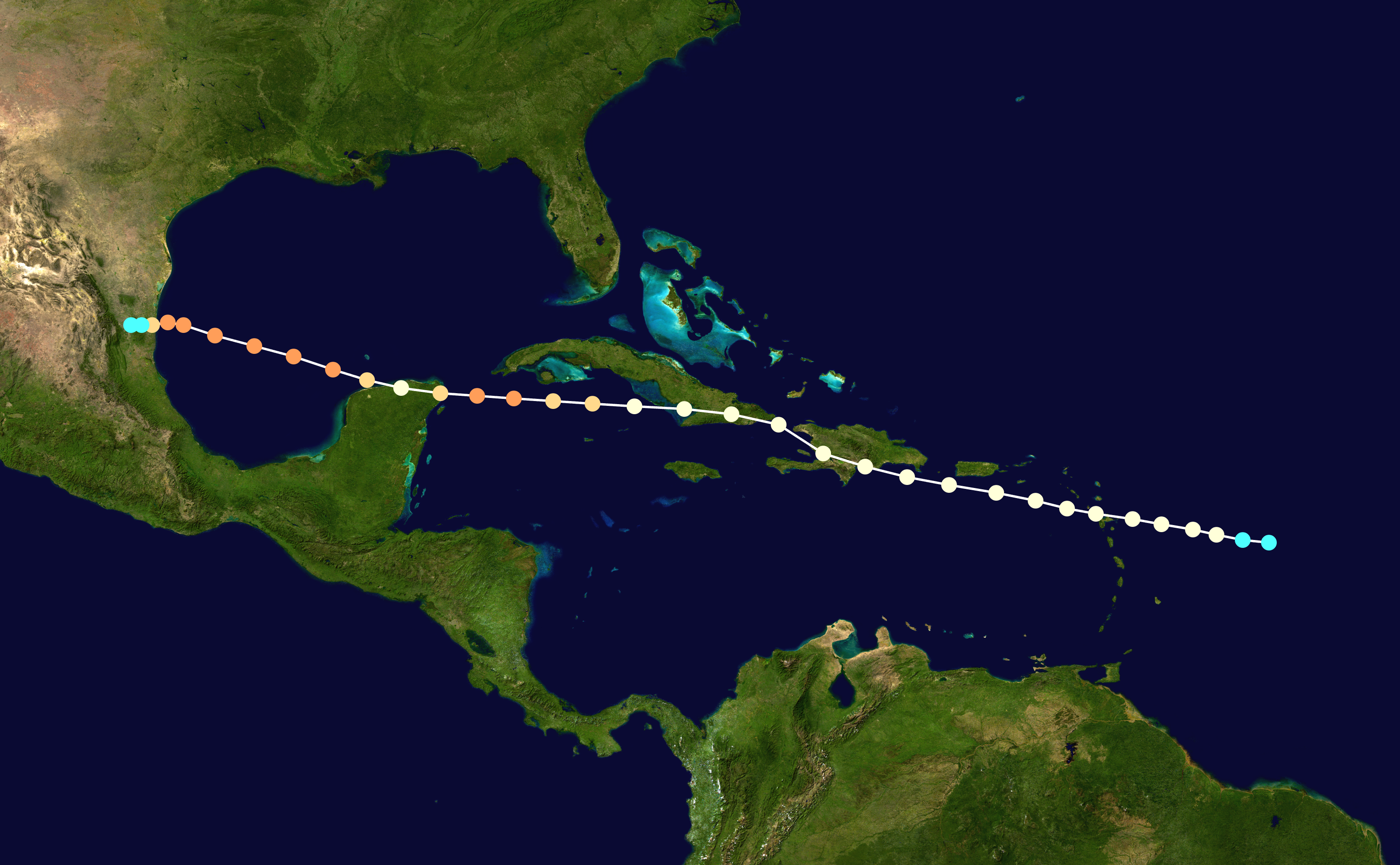
- Duration: August 20 – August 28
- Peak intensity: 120 mph (195 km/h) (1-min); 955 mbar (hPa)

The Monterrey Hurricane of 1909

Originating from a tropical storm east of the Leeward Islands on August 20, the storm tracked west-northwest, entering the Caribbean Sea as a minimal hurricane the next day. After striking Hispaniola on August 23, the hurricane made another landfall in eastern Cuba before reentering the Caribbean. Once back over open water, the storm intensified into a Category 3 hurricane and moved across the northern tip of the Yucatán Peninsula. By August 26, the storm had emerged into the Gulf of Mexico as a weakened but regrouping system. It attained its peak winds of 120 mph (185 km/h) that evening. Maintaining this intensity, the system made landfall in the Mexican state of Tamaulipas late on August 27 and rapidly dissipated the following afternoon.

Throughout its existence, the hurricane remained relatively close to land, so consequently it effected many areas of the northern Caribbean Sea. Although the storm impacted several islands, only Haiti reported damage during the hurricane's passage. In northeastern Mexico, catastrophic flooding occurred due to the storm, especially in the city of Monterrey. In that city, more than half of the structures were flooded, hundreds were destroyed, and 20,000 people were left homeless. Throughout Mexico, reports indicated that 4,000 people were killed by the hurricane, making it the tenth deadliest Atlantic hurricane on record. Monetary losses were also estimated to have exceeded $50 million.

=== Tropical Storm Seven ===
- Tropical storm (SSHWS)
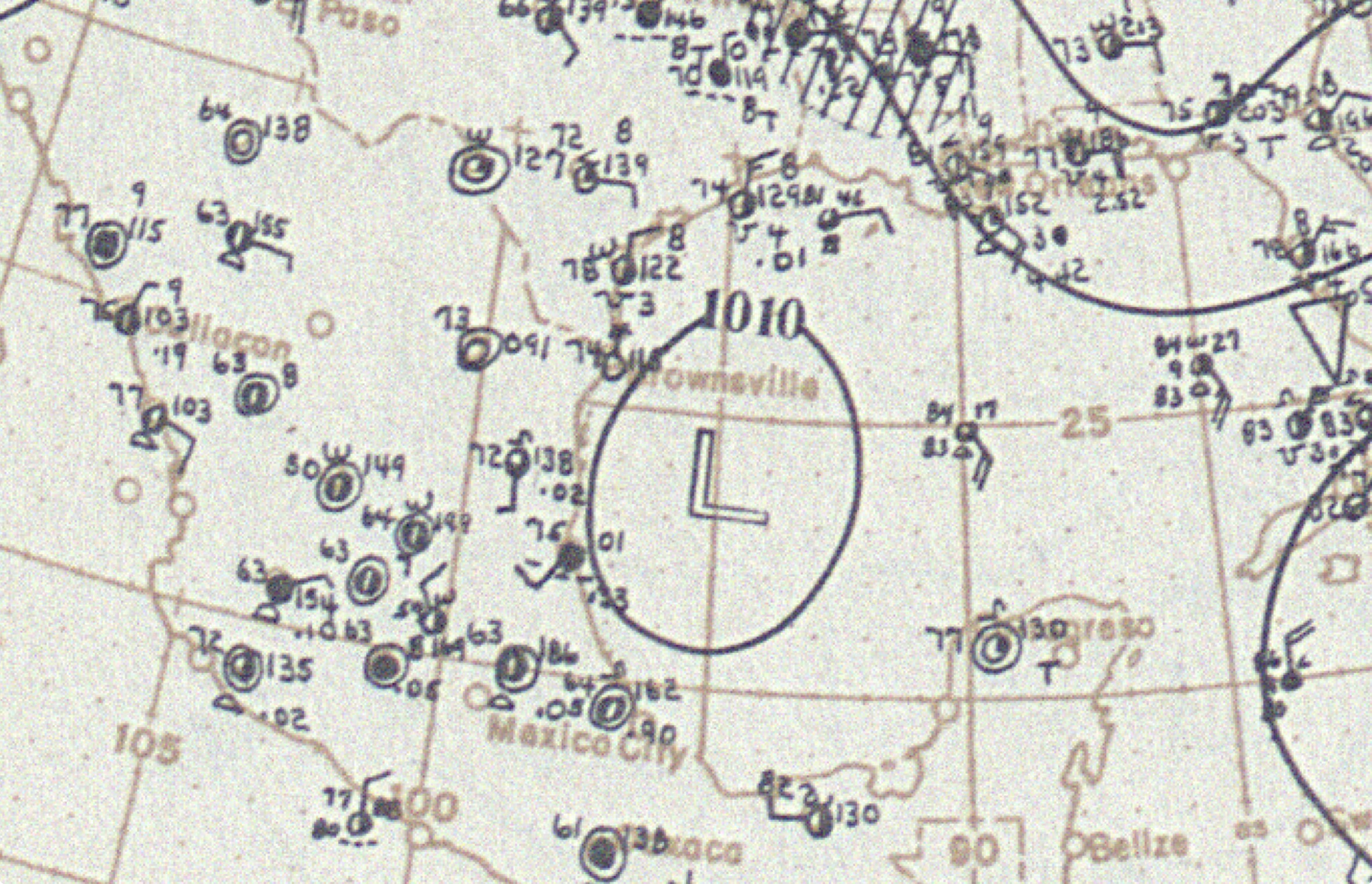
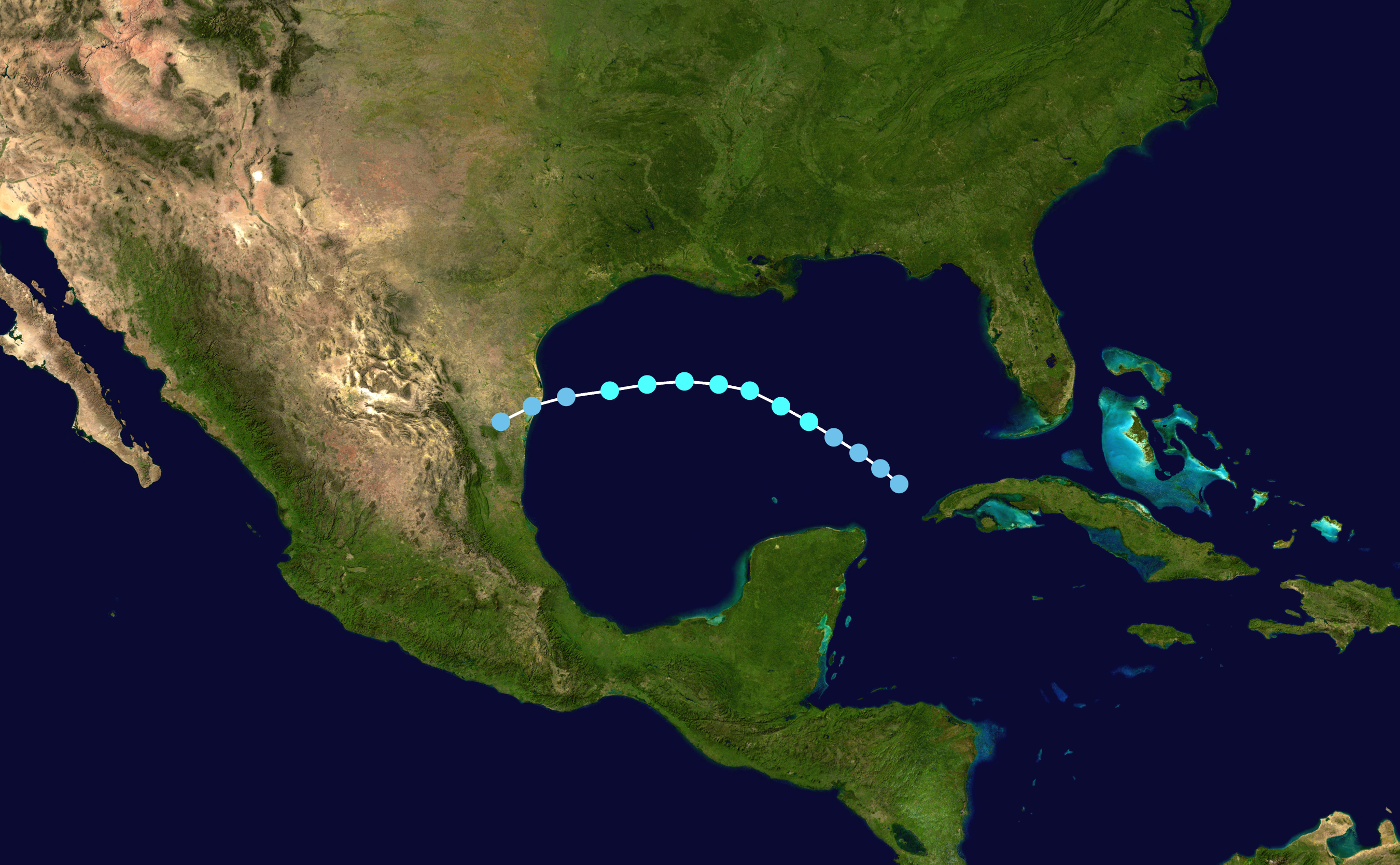
- Duration: August 22 – August 25
- Peak intensity: 50 mph (85 km/h) (1-min);

A low-pressure area formed over the central Gulf of Mexico between August 19 and August 20. Ships and weather maps indicate that a tropical depression developed from the low to the northwest of the western tip of Cuba at 00:00 UTC on August 22. The system moved northwestward and intensified into a tropical storm about 24 hours later. By 12:00 UTC on August 23, sustained winds were estimated to have peaked at 50 mph (85 km/h). The storm began curving to the west-southwest shortly thereafter. Late on August 24, the cyclone weakened to a tropical depression while approaching the coast of Mexico, with the weakening probably caused by wind shear generated by the sixth storm. The cyclone made landfall in northern Tamaulipas near the United States border early the following day, and promptly dissipated. The highest wind speed observed on land was 36 mph (58 km/h) in New Orleans.

=== Tropical Storm Eight ===
- Tropical storm (SSHWS)
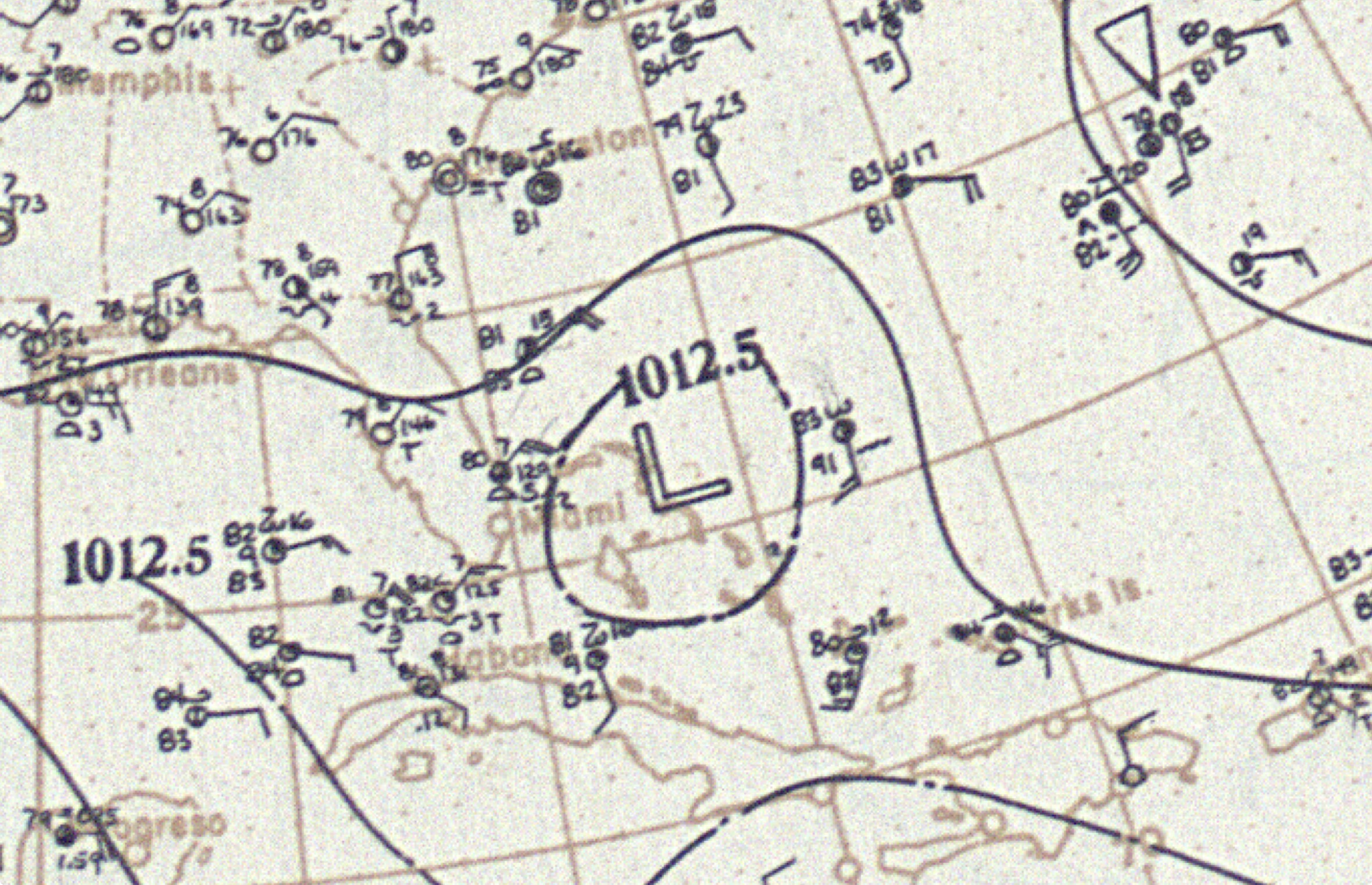
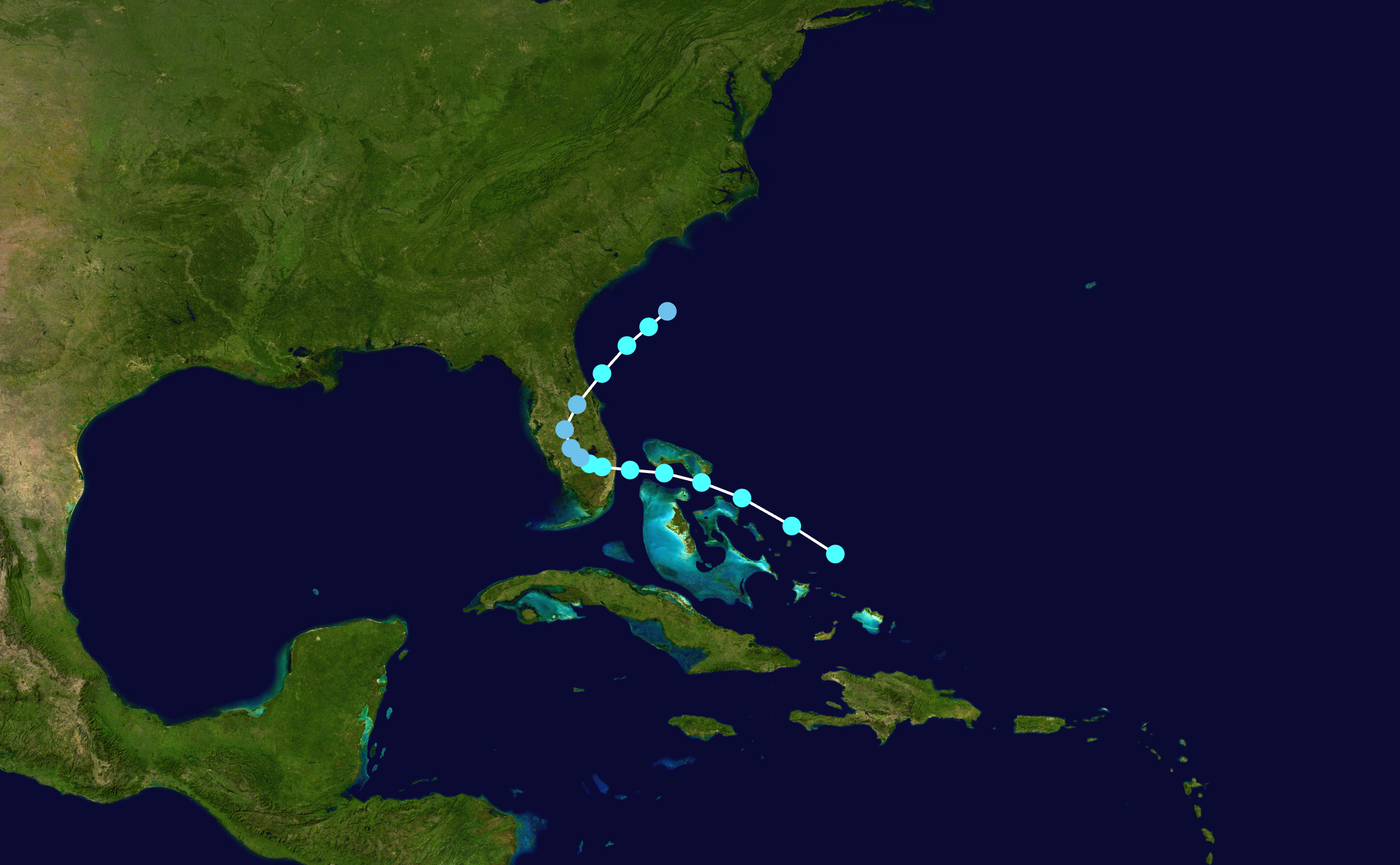
- Duration: August 28 – August 31
- Peak intensity: 50 mph (85 km/h) (1-min); 1009 mbar (hPa)

A ship first indicated the presence of this storm about 60 mi (95 km) northeast of Samana Cay in the Bahamas on August 28. The cyclone moved west-northwestward and struck the southern end of Abaco Islands later that day. Early on August 9, the storm is estimated to have peaked with maximum sustained winds of 50 mph (85 km/h), based on a minimum barometric pressure of 1,009 mbar (29.8 inHg) observed by a ship. The cyclone made landfall around 09:00 UTC near modern-day Boca Raton, Florida. Moving inland, the system weakened to a tropical depression early on August 30 while just to the west of Lake Okeechobee, where it began curving northwestward. Around midday, the cyclone turned northeastward. Late on August 30, the storm reemerged into the Atlantic Ocean and restrengthened into a tropical storm early the following day. The reintensification was short-lived, with the cyclone weakening to a tropical depression and dissipating about 120 mi (190 km) southeast of Charleston, South Carolina.

=== Hurricane Nine ===
- Category 3 hurricane (SSHWS)
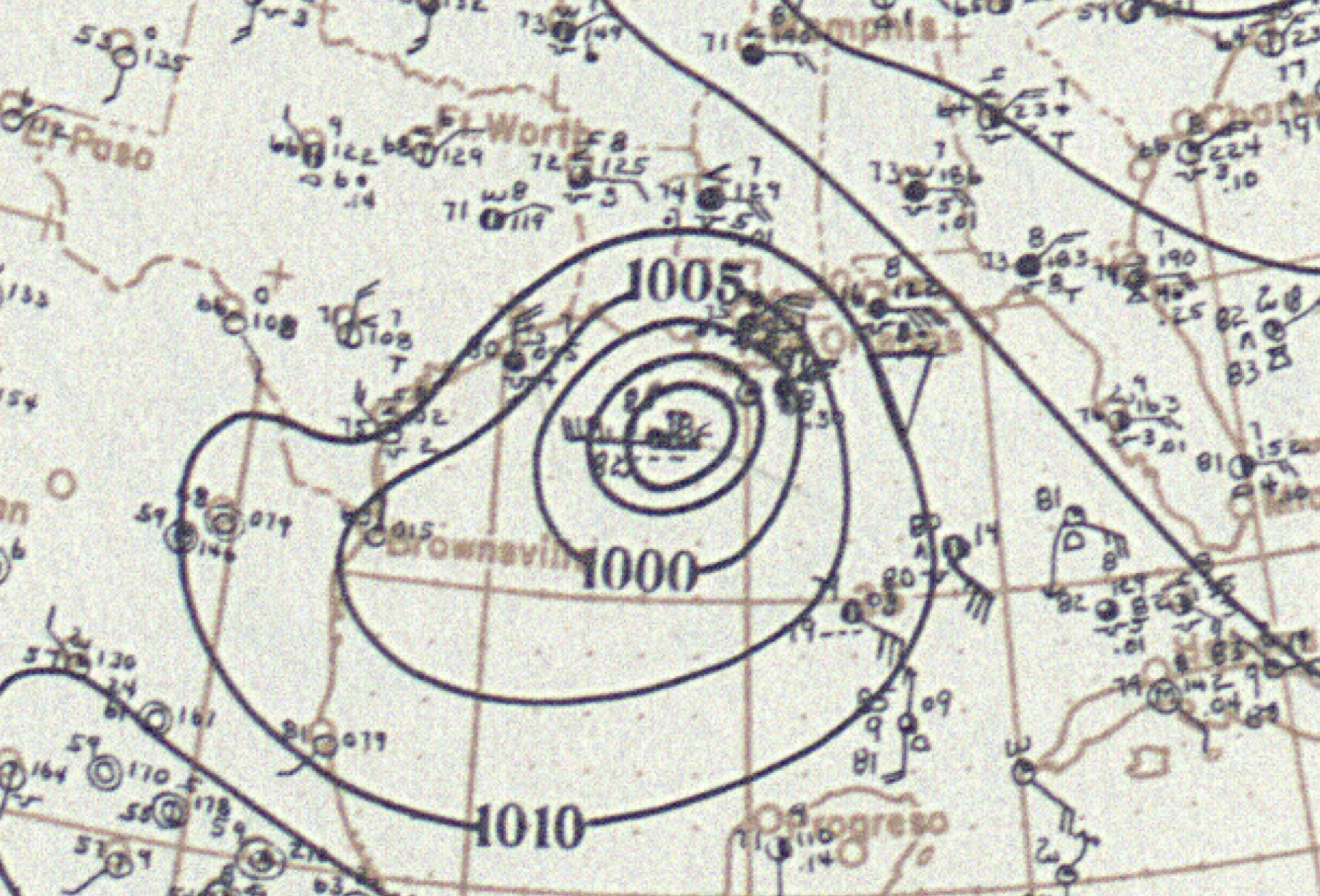
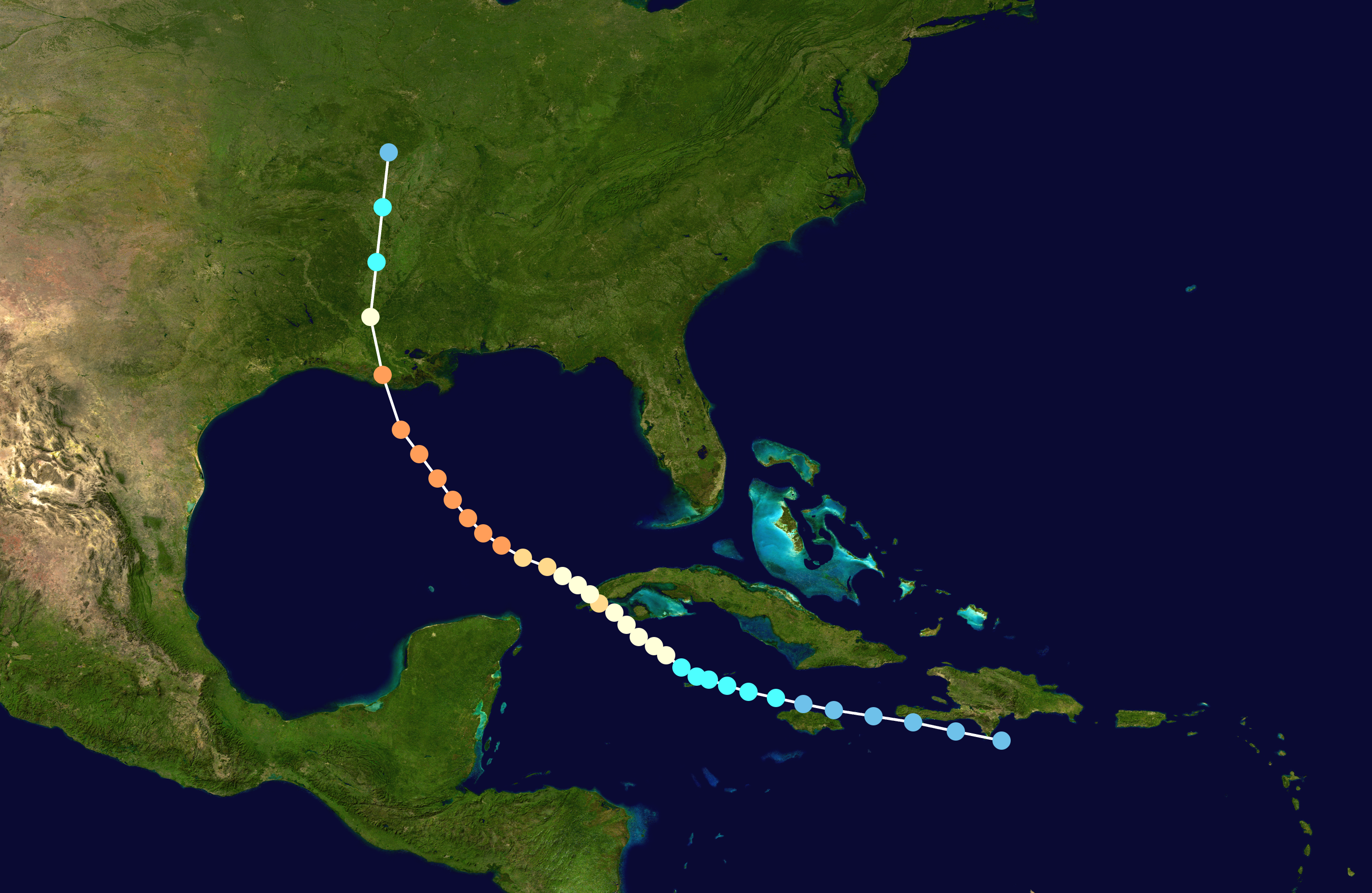
- Duration: September 13 – September 22
- Peak intensity: 120 mph (195 km/h) (1-min); 952 mbar (hPa)

The Grand Isle Hurricane of 1909

During early September, a tropical disturbance over the western Atlantic began to strengthen as it moved towards the Lesser Antilles. By September 13, the system had become sufficiently organized to be classified as a tropical depression. Moving west-northwestward, the depression attained tropical storm status near Jamaica on September 15 and hurricane intensity the following day. By September 18, the hurricane had attained winds of 100 mph (155 km/h) as it moved over the western tip of Cuba. After briefly weakening due to its interaction with land, the storm re-intensified over the Gulf of Mexico, attaining winds of 120 mph (185 km/h), becoming the third major hurricane of the season. Maintaining this strength, the storm eventually made landfall near Grand Isle, Louisiana, on September 21. Rapid weakening took place as it quickly moved northward, dissipating the following day over Missouri.

In western Cuba, the storm brought strong winds and heavy precipitation to several areas. Numerous buildings suffered severe damage and a large portion of the orange crop was lost. Ships were pushed onshore by the hurricane's large swells. Throughout Pinar del Río Province, damage was estimated at $1 million. The steamship Nicholas Castina capsized near Isla de la Juventud, drowning at least 29 people. In the United States, the hurricane killed at least 350 people and wrought $10 million in damage. Thousands of homes were destroyed by the cyclone's powerful storm surge which penetrated 2 mi (3.2 km) inland. The states of Louisiana, Mississippi, and Alabama sustained the most severe damage, especially from strong winds which covered a large area.

=== Tropical Storm Ten ===
- Tropical storm (SSHWS)
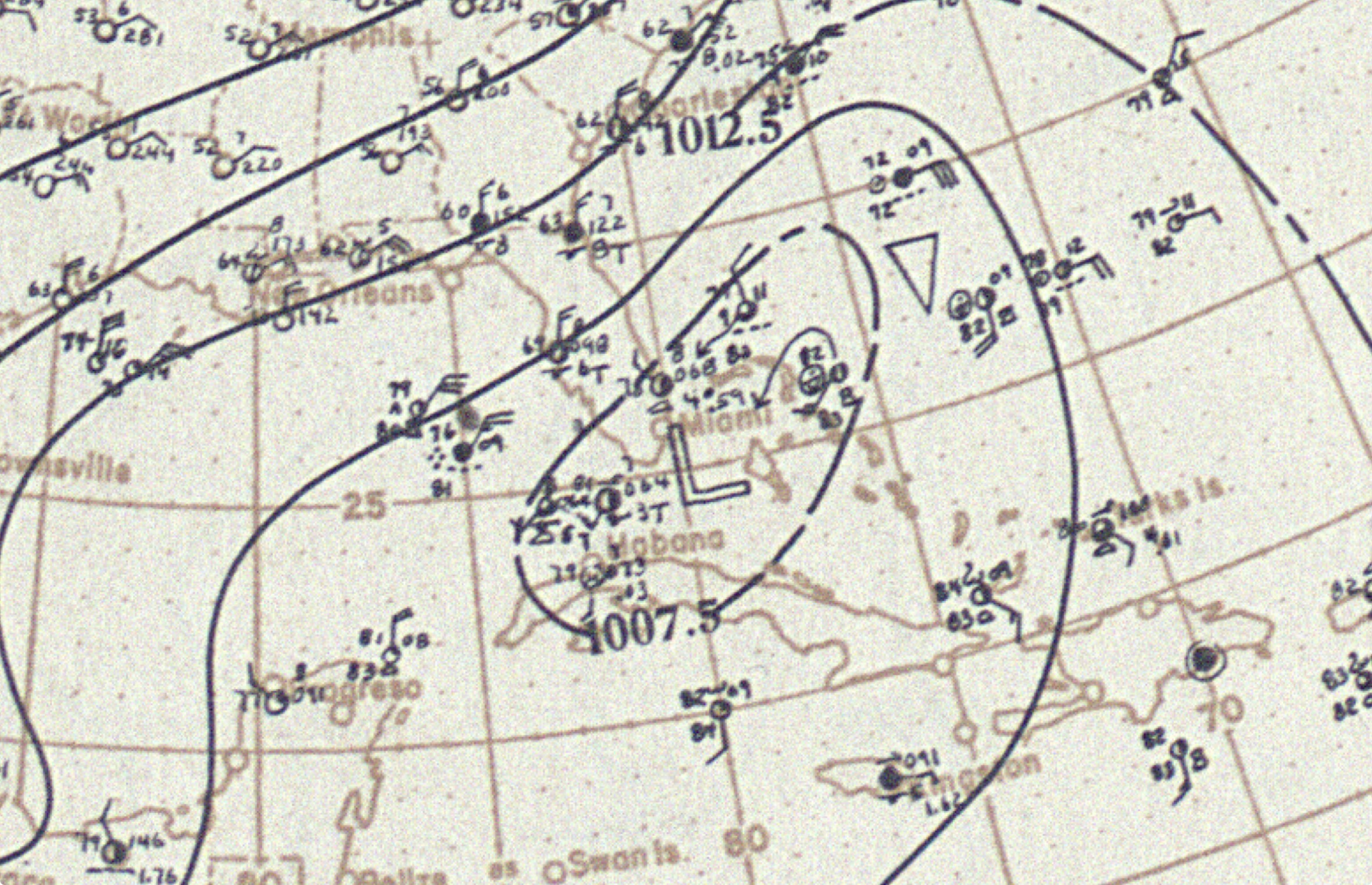
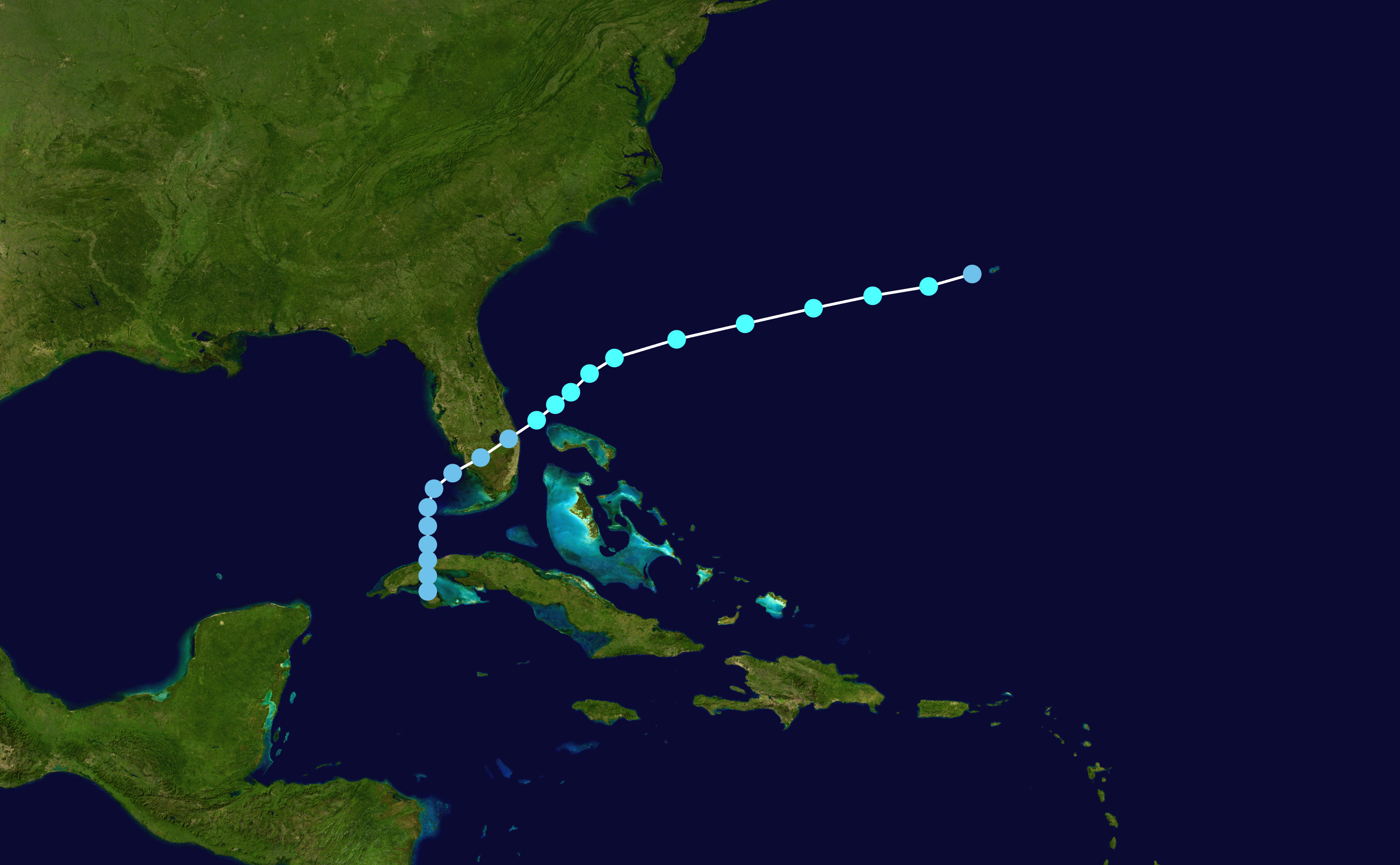
- Duration: September 24 – September 29
- Peak intensity: 60 mph (95 km/h) (1-min); <1000 mbar (hPa)

Observations from a ship and weather maps indicate that a tropical depression developed near the north coast of Isla de la Juventud on September 24. Moving northward, the depression soon struck the Caribbean coast of modern-day Artemisa Province in Cuba. Heavy rainfall and gusty winds were reported in the now defunct Santa Clara Province. The depression emerged into the Gulf of Mexico and failed to intensify further before making landfall near Naples, Florida late on September 25. Moving northeastward, the cyclone emerged into the Atlantic Ocean and strengthened into a tropical storm around 12:00 UTC on September 26. About 24 hours later, the system peaked with maximum sustained winds of 60 mph (95 km/h). Thereafter, the storm began weakening. However, on September 28, a ship observed a barometric pressure of 1,000 mbar (30 inHg), the lowest known in relation to the storm. Around 00:00 UTC on September 29, the cyclone weakened to a tropical depression just west of Bermuda and dissipated shortly thereafter.

=== Hurricane Eleven ===
Key West Hurricane of 1909

- Category 3 hurricane (SSHWS)
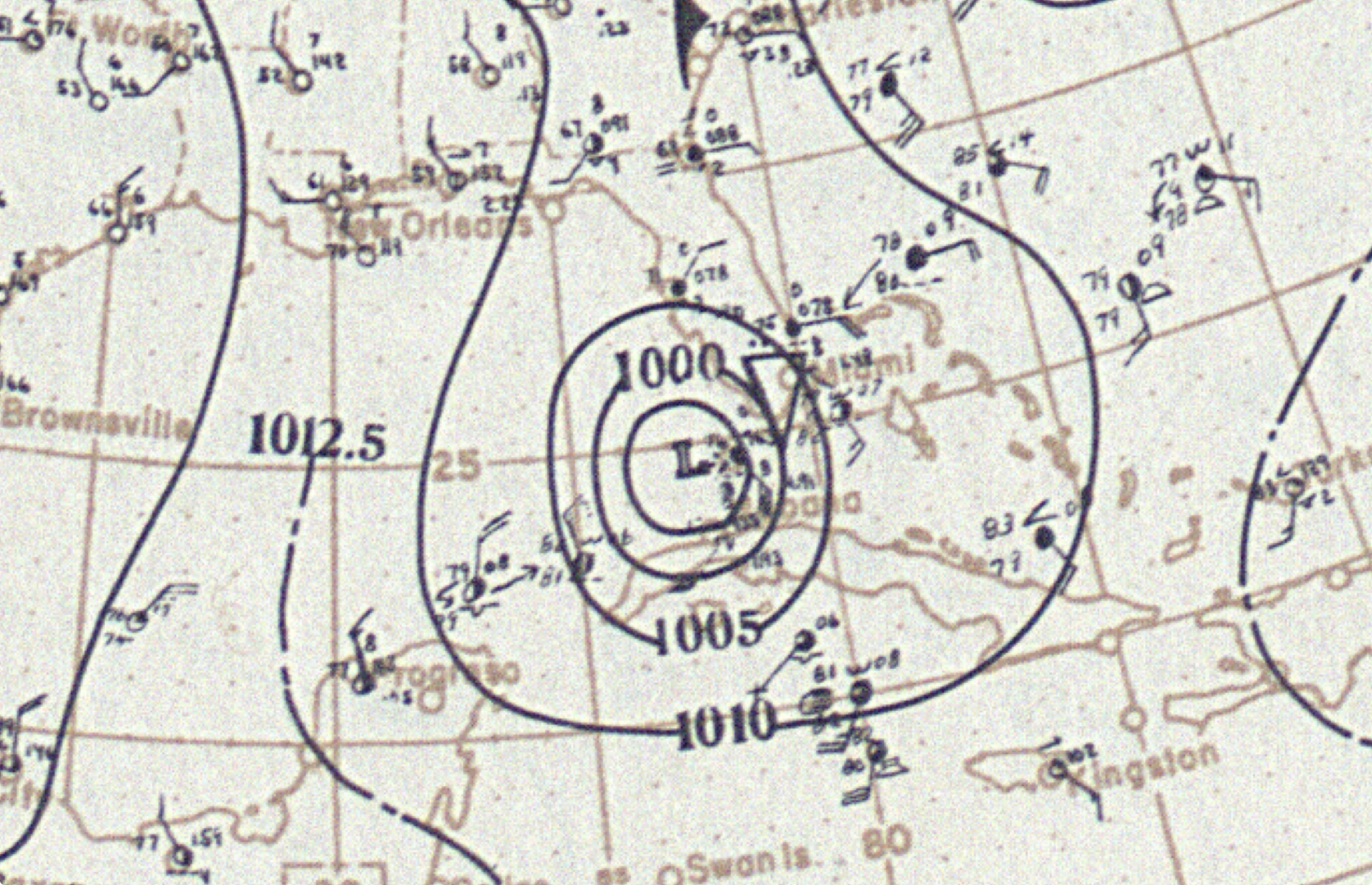
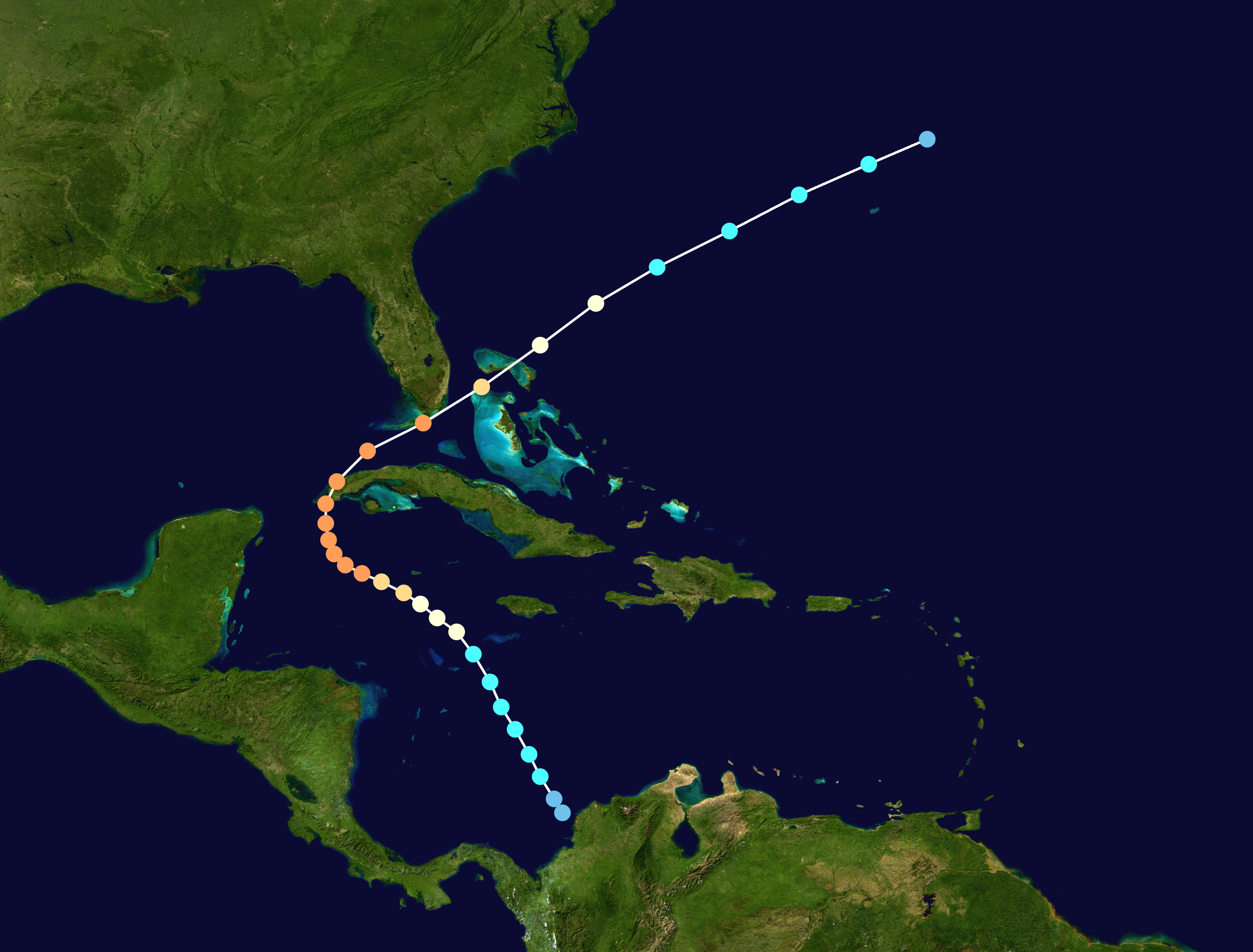
- Duration: October 6 – October 13
- Peak intensity: 120 mph (195 km/h) (1-min); 957 mbar (hPa)

The storm was first detected in the Caribbean about 35 mi (55 km) northwest of Cartagena, Colombia, on October 6. Initially a tropical depression, the system became a tropical storm early on the next day while heading northwestward. By October 8, the storm became a Category 1 hurricane to the southwest of Jamaica. The hurricane curved west-northwestward and intensified throughout the next day, becoming Category 3 intensity late on October 9. The cyclone peaked with winds of 120 mph (195 km/h) early on October 10. Later that day, it turned to the north and made landfall in Sandino, Pinar del Río Province. After traversing the western extremity of Cuba, the storm entered the Straights of Florida and turned northeastward. The hurricane made landfall near Marathon, Florida, late on October 11 with winds of 115 mph (185 km/h). Thereafter, the system weakened quickly while crossing the northwestern Bahamas and the western Atlantic, falling to tropical storm intensity late on October 12. About 24 hours later, it weakened to a tropical depression and then dissipated 200 mi (320 km) northeast of Bermuda.

In western Cuba, strong winds and large waves left severe damage. The cities of Cayuco and La Fe in Pinar del Río Province were completely destroyed, while Guane experienced considerable devastation and every house in Puerto Esperanza suffered damage due to strong winds. In Havana alone, the storm caused five fatalities and about $1 million in damage. The large waves reached the coast of Mexico's Yucatán Peninsula, causing many fishermen and their families to drown. In Key West, the streets became a "mess of wreckage", with at least 500 homes were destroyed and at least 400 buildings throughout the city being damaged or demolished. Overall, damage in Key West reached approximately $2 million and there were two fatal injuries. Worst damage in Key West since 1870 hurricanes. Damage to Keys railroad not as great as the similar 1906 hurricane storm. At several locations in the Florida Keys, the Florida East Coast Railway was damaged. Twelve deaths occurred at Bahia Honda Key after the tugboat Sybil wrecked there. In Marathon, the timekeeper drowned. In Miami, a number of structures were deroofed, while the newly built hotel suffered severe damage, but impact otherwise primarily limited to downed trees. Along its path, the storm killed 34 people.

=== Hurricane Twelve ===
- Category 2 hurricane (SSHWS)
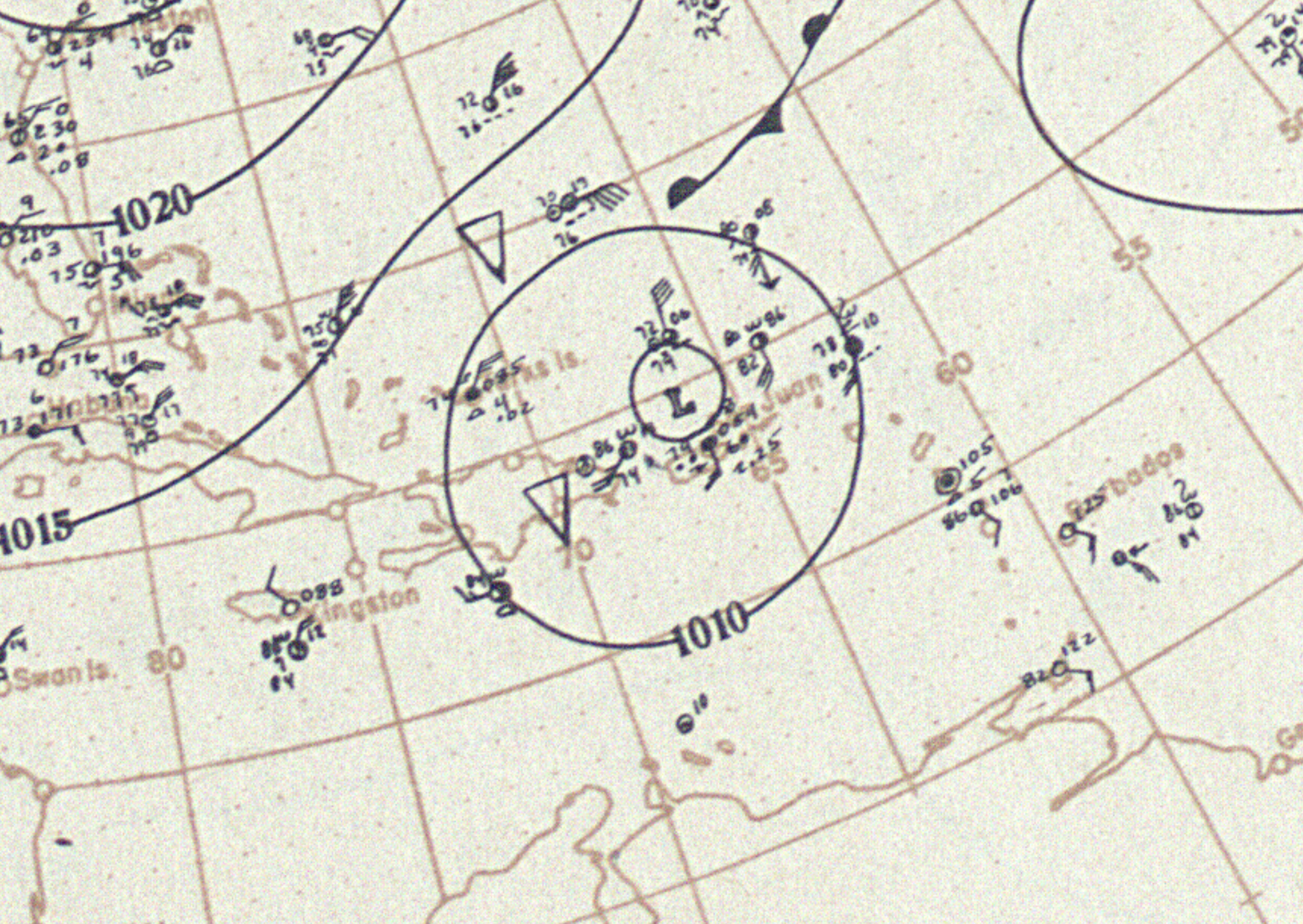
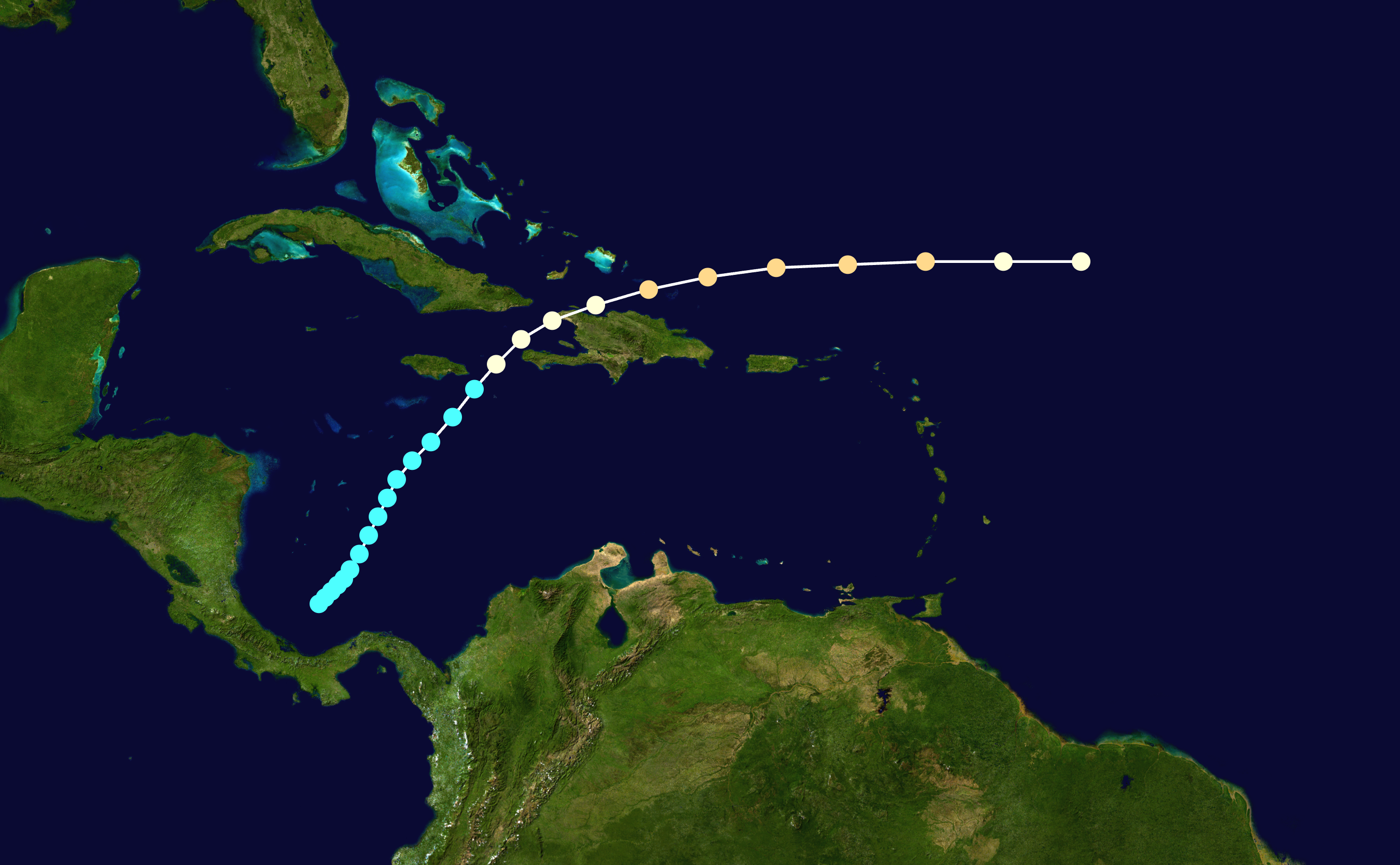
- Duration: November 8 – November 14
- Peak intensity: 105 mph (165 km/h) (1-min);

The final storm of the season formed from a large weather system over the southwestern Caribbean Sea on November 8. Tracking northwestward, the system gradually intensified. On November 11, the storm brushed the eastern tip of Jamaica before attaining hurricane-status several hours later. During the afternoon of November 12, the hurricane made landfall in northeastern Haiti with winds of 85 mph (140 km/h) before entering the Atlantic Ocean. Once in the Atlantic, the storm further intensified to attain peak winds of 105 mph (165 km/h) on November 13 as it accelerated eastward. The system rapidly transitioned into an extratropical cyclone the following day before being absorbed by a frontal system northeast of the Lesser Antilles.

In Jamaica, torrential rains from the storm, peaking at 114.50 in (2,908 mm) at Silver Hill Plantation, wrought widespread damage. Throughout the country, roughly 500,000 banana plants were lost as a result of the floods, about 20% of the entire country's yield. The storm left 30 people dead and $7 million in damage. Nearby Haiti suffered more severe losses from the storm, with 166 people confirmed to have died and hundreds other presumed dead. Additionally, damage reached at least $3 million. Widespread flooding and landslides destroyed entire villages and ruined transportation.

== Season effects ==
Saffir–Simpson scale
TD	TS	C1	C2	C3	C4	C5

1909 North Atlantic tropical cyclone season statistics
Storm name	Dates active	Storm category at peak intensity	Max 1-min wind mph (km/h)	Min. press. (mbar)	Areas affected	Damage (US$)	Deaths	Ref(s).
One	June 15–19	Tropical storm	45 (75)	1009	Central America	None	0	
Two	June 25–30	Category 2 hurricane	100 (155)	972	Texas, Mexico	$1.3 million	0	
Three	June 26 – July 4	Tropical storm	50 (85)	1005	Bahamas, Florida, Georgia	Unknown	0	
Four	July 13–22	Category 3 hurricane	115 (185)	959	Cuba, Texas	$2 million	41	
Five	August 6–10	Tropical storm	45 (75)	1004	Mexico	None	0	
Unnumbered	August 7–18	Tropical depression	Unknown	1004	None	None	0	
Six	August 20–28	Category 3 hurricane	120 (195)	955	Lesser Antilles, Greater Antilles, Mexico	$50 million	4,000	
Seven	August 22–25	Tropical storm	50 (85)	Unknown	Louisiana, Texas, Mexico	None	0	
Eight	August 28–31	Tropical storm	50 (85)	1009	Bahamas, Florida, Georgia	None	0	
Nine	September 13–22	Category 3 hurricane	120 (195)	952	Cuba, Gulf Coast of the United States, Arkansas, Tennessee, Missouri, Illinois	$11 million	400	
Ten	September 24–29	Tropical storm	60 (95)	1000	Cuba, Florida	None	0	
Eleven	October 6–13	Category 3 hurricane	120 (195)	957	Cuba, Florida, Bahamas, Bermuda	$3 million	34	
Twelve	November 8–14	Category 2 hurricane	105 (185)	Unknown	Greater Antilles	$10 million	198	
Season aggregates
12 systems	June 15 – November 14		120 (195)	952		77.3	4,673	

== See also ==
- 1900–1940 South Pacific cyclone seasons
- 1900–1950 South-West Indian Ocean cyclone seasons
- 1900s Australian region cyclone seasons
