= 1909 Greater Antilles hurricane =

Category 2 Atlantic hurricane in 1909

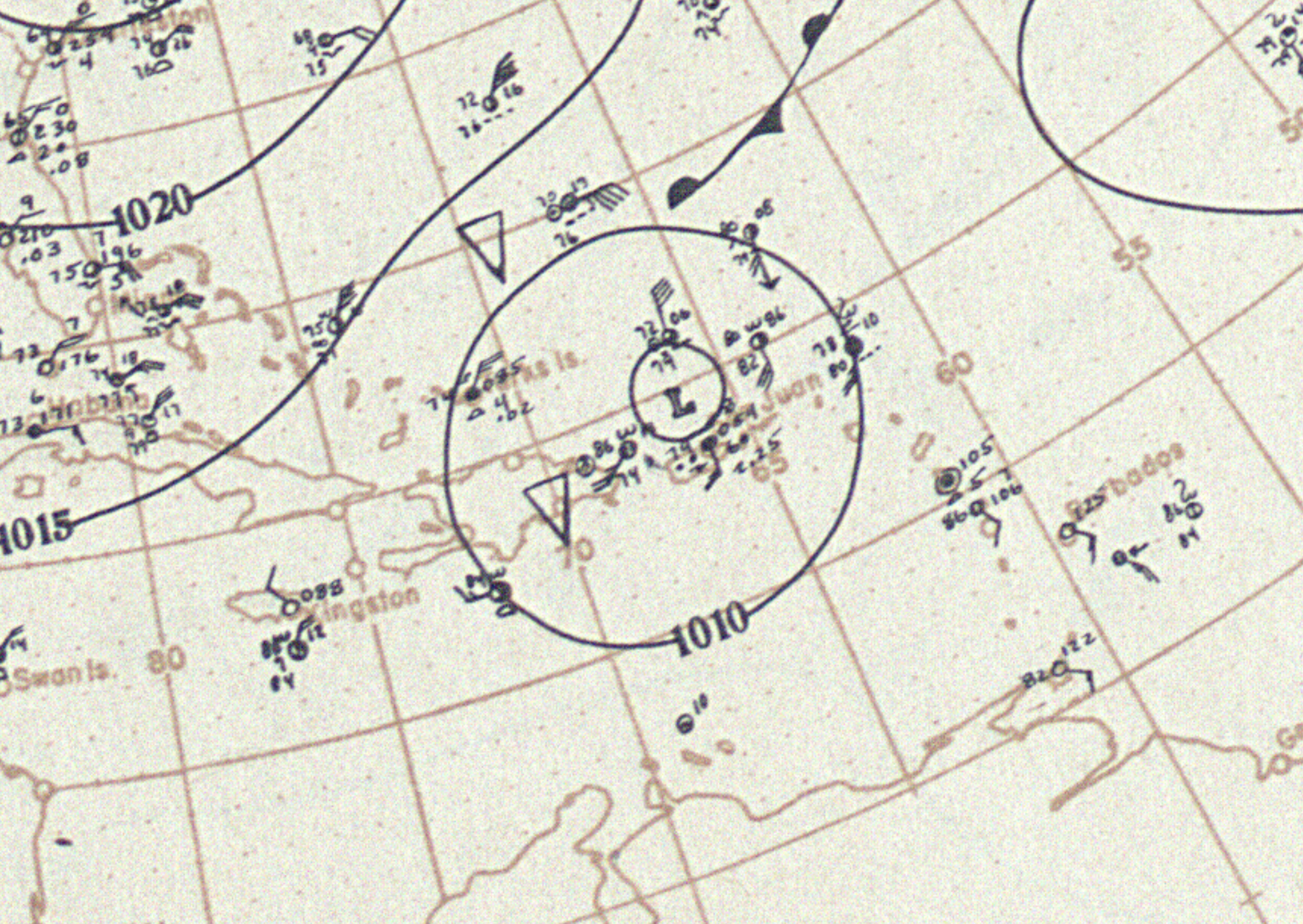
- Surface weather analysis showing the hurricane north of Puerto Rico on November 13

Meteorological history
- Formed: November 8, 1909
- Dissipated: November 14, 1909

Category 2 hurricane
- 1-minute sustained (SSHWS/NWS)
- Highest winds: 105 mph (165 km/h)

Overall effects
- Fatalities: At least 198 direct
- Damage: $10 million (1909 USD)
- Areas affected: Jamaica, Cuba, Haiti and the Dominican Republic
- IBTrACS
- Part of the 1909 Atlantic hurricane season

The 1909 Greater Antilles hurricane was a rare, late-season tropical cyclone that caused extensive damage and loss of life in Jamaica and Haiti, and the wettest Atlantic hurricane on record. Forming out of a large disturbance in early November, the hurricane began as a minimal tropical storm over the southwestern Caribbean on November 8. Slowly tracking northeastward, the system gradually intensified. Late on November 11, the storm brushed the eastern tip of Jamaica before attaining hurricane status. The following afternoon, the storm made landfall in northwest Haiti with winds of 85 mph (135 km/h). After moving over the Atlantic Ocean, the hurricane further intensified and attained its peak winds of 105 mph (170 km/h) on November 13. The system rapidly transitioned into an extratropical cyclone the following day before being absorbed by a frontal system northeast of the Lesser Antilles.

Including rainfall from the precursor to the hurricane, rainfall in Jamaica peaked at 114.50 in (2,908 mm) at Silver Hill Plantation, making it the wettest tropical cyclone on record in the Atlantic Basin. These extreme rains led to widespread flooding that killed 30 people and left $7 million in damage throughout the country. The worst damage in Haiti was caused by rains exceeding 24 in (610 mm) that led to catastrophic flooding. At least 166 people are known to have been killed in the country; however, reports indicate that hundreds likely died during the storm.

== Meteorological history ==
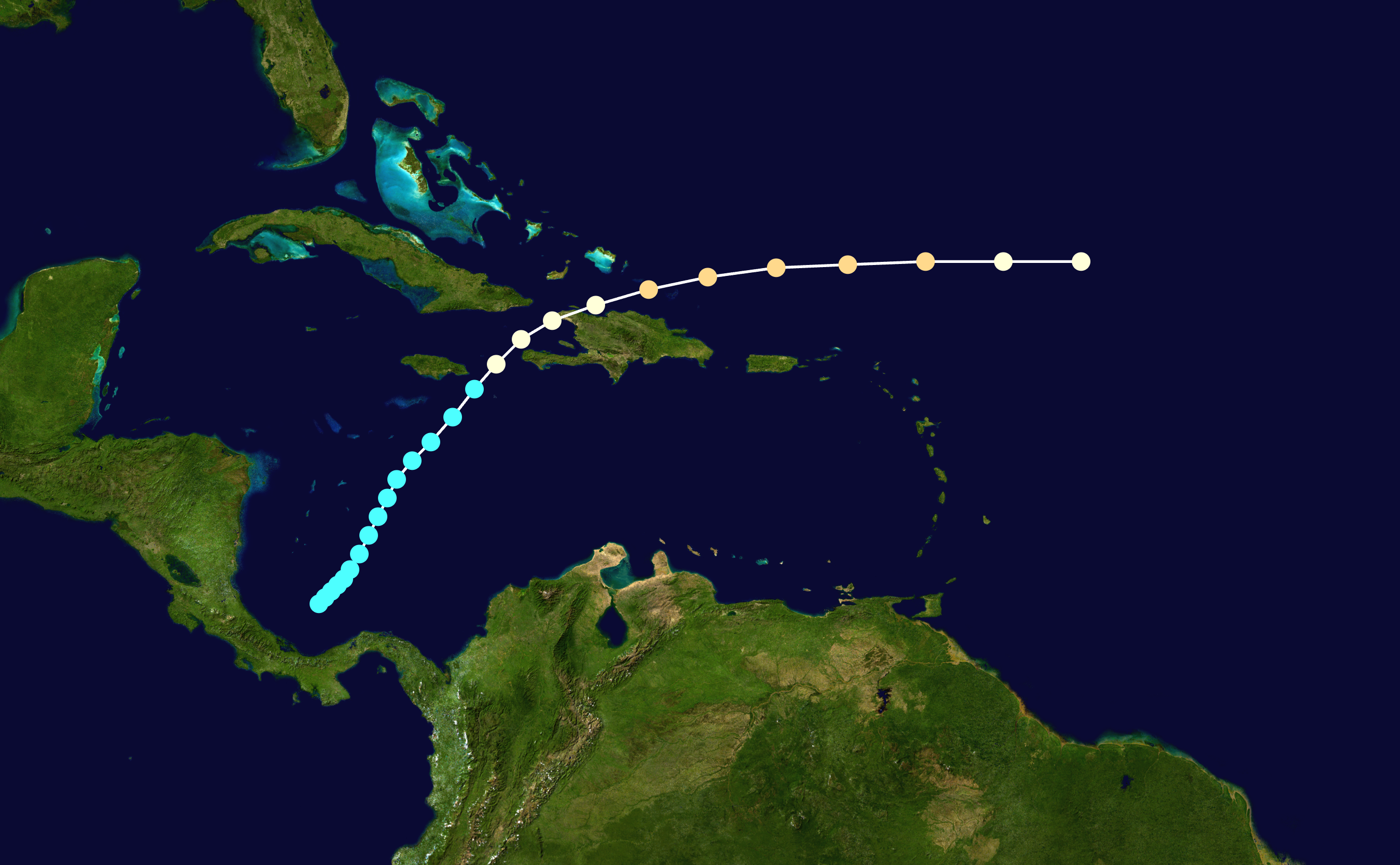
Map plotting the storm's track and intensity, according to the Saffir–Simpson scale Map key Saffir–Simpson scale Tropical depression (≤38 mph, ≤62 km/h) Tropical storm (39–73 mph, 63–118 km/h) Category 1 (74–95 mph, 119–153 km/h) Category 2 (96–110 mph, 154–177 km/h) Category 3 (111–129 mph, 178–208 km/h) Category 4 (130–156 mph, 209–251 km/h) Category 5 (≥157 mph, ≥252 km/h) Unknown Storm type Tropical cyclone Subtropical cyclone Extratropical cyclone, remnant low, tropical disturbance, or monsoon depression

The origins of the 1909 Greater Antilles hurricane are unclear, but are believed to have begun with a large, slow-moving storm system near Jamaica in early November. By November 8, it was classified as a tropical storm and was situated over the southwestern Caribbean, north of Panama. A ship in the vicinity of the system recorded an atmospheric pressure of 1004 mbar (hPa; 29.65 inHg). Slowly moving northeastward, an unusual direction for a Caribbean cyclone, the storm gradually intensified. The forward motion of the system steadily increased on November 10 as it headed towards Jamaica. Late on November 11, the system brushed the eastern tip of Jamaica as a strong tropical storm, with maximum winds estimated at 70 mph (115 km/h). Several hours later, the storm intensified into what would now be classified a Category 1 hurricane on the Saffir–Simpson hurricane scale. During the afternoon of November 12, the hurricane made landfall in northern Haiti, in Nord-Ouest, with winds of 85 mph (135 km/h). After briefly moving over land, the storm entered the Atlantic Ocean and turned east-northeast and further accelerated.

Early on November 13, the hurricane further intensified to the equivalent of a Category 2 system and attained peak winds of 105 mph (170 km/h). No barometric pressure was recorded at the time of peak intensity since it occurred over water and away from any ships. In an initial analysis of the storm made by meteorologist José Fernández Partagás in 1999, he wrote that at the storm's peak, it was a strong tropical storm, not a hurricane. In a report, it was stated that "It was a difficult case for the author [Partagás] to decide whether or not to upgrade to a hurricane". It was not until the Atlantic hurricane database re-analysis reached 1909 in February 2004 that the storm was designated as a hurricane. By November 14, the storm began to weaken as it turned nearly due east. Later that day, it quickly transitioned into an extratropical cyclone before being absorbed by a frontal system northeast of the Lesser Antilles.

== Impact ==
Wettest tropical cyclones and their remnants in Jamaica Highest-known totals
Precipitation			Storm	Location	Ref.
Rank	mm	in	Storm	Location	Ref.
1	3429.0	135.00	Nov. 1909 Hurricane	Silver Hill Plantation	
2	1524.0	60.00	Flora 1963	Silver Hill	
3	1057.9	41.65	Michelle 2001		
4	950.0	37.42	Nicole 2010	Negril	
5	938.3	36.94	Gilda 1973	Top Mountain	
6	863.6	34.00	June 1979 T.D.	Western Jamaica	
7	823.0	32.40	Gilbert 1988	Interior mountains	
8	733.8	28.89	Eta 2020	Moore Town, Jamaica	
9	720.6	28.37	Ivan 2004	Ritchies	
10	713.5	28.09	Sandy 2012	Mill Bank	

=== Jamaica ===
Prior to becoming a tropical storm, the precursor low had been producing heavy rainfall across Jamaica since November 5. Further rains fell as the system intensified and neared the country. Between November 5 and 11, the system produced 30.45 in (773 mm) of rain in Kingston. More extreme rains fell upon the Silver Hill Plantation, where 114.50 inches (2,908 mm) of rain accumulated in the five-day period of November 5–9, with eight-day totals from November 4–11 reaching 135.00 inches (3,429 mm). This rainfall triggered severe flooding. Roughly 500,000 banana plants were lost as a result of the floods, about 20% of the entire country's yield. Around Kingston, the waterworks was destroyed and several tunnels and railways were blocked by landslides. Many bridges and roads were also damaged or destroyed. This led to many towns being isolated and hampered rescue efforts. Flood waters in the town of Annott Bay reached 3 ft (0.91 m). Throughout Jamaica, the flooding killed 30 people and damage was estimated at $7 million (1909 USD). Following the severe flooding, the Jamaican government allocated about $150,000 in funds for damage repair. Communication cables were partly repaired and connection with Kingston was re-established by November 15, and communications across the Caribbean were repaired by November 25.

=== Haiti ===
In nearby Haiti, the damage from the hurricane was catastrophic as torrential rains triggered widespread flooding and landslides throughout the country. Rainfall in the first half of November reached 29 in (740 mm) in Cap-Haïtien, while totals in interior Haiti reached 38 in (970 mm). Initial reports from Haiti were slow to reach the news media as most roads were flooded or destroyed. Several days after the hurricane's passage, reports began to indicate that immense damage had taken place due to the storm. The Tonazeau River near Port-au-Prince also topped its banks, inundating nearby areas.

The city of Gonaïves was completely flooded for two days after a nearby river overflowed its banks. All of the city's roads were damaged or destroyed. Residents sought safety from the flood waters in the upper floors and roofs of their homes. Sixteen people were killed in the city after a bridge was destroyed by the swollen river. Bodies were unearthed from cemeteries and floated through the city. At least 19 people died in Port-de-Paix. Cap-Haïtien was devastated by what press reports described as a "tidal wave".

Along the Yaqui River, unprecedented flooding led to the creation of a large lake, estimated to be 30 mi (48 km) long and up to 80 ft (24 m) deep. Many villages were destroyed by the floods, with hundreds of fatalities expected to result from the storm. Monetary losses for Haiti following the disaster are scarce, with the only known damage estimate being $3 million. However, the true damage cost from the hurricane is likely much higher. At least 166 fatalities are known as a result of the storm in Haiti; however, many reports state that several hundred people likely perished during the storm. Most of the fatalities took place in the Nord-Ouest, where 150 victims were identified. Earthquakes accompanied the devastating floods.

=== Elsewhere ===
Seven days of rain affected parts of the Dominican Republic, with at least 48 in (1,200 mm) falling in a four-day period in Puerto Plata. Floods and landslides caused extensive damage. The railway connecting Santiago de los Caballeros and Moca was severed and two bridges near Puerto Plata was destroyed. Communications with interior communities was cut off. Heavy rain and hurricane-force winds were reported across the Turks and Caicos.

== See also ==
- List of wettest tropical cyclones
