= 1915 New Orleans hurricane =

Category 4 Atlantic hurricane in 1915

Hurricane Six 1915 New Orleans hurricane New Orleans hurricane of 1915
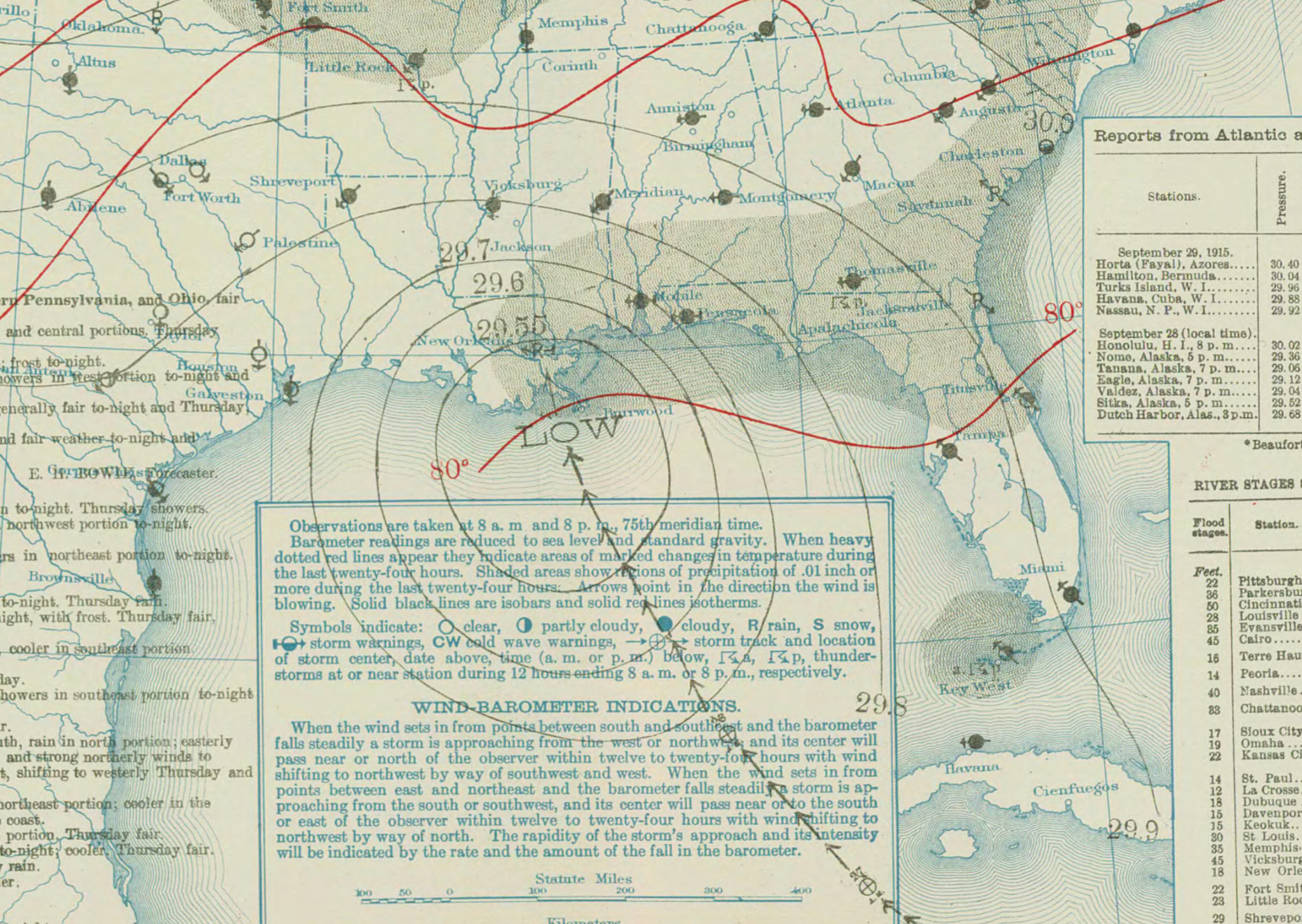
- Weather map of the hurricane nearing landfall in southeast Louisiana on September 29

Meteorological history
- Formed: September 21, 1915
- Dissipated: October 1, 1915

Category 4 major hurricane
- 1-minute sustained (SSHWS/NWS)
- Highest winds: 145 mph (230 km/h)
- Lowest pressure: 931 mbar (hPa); 27.49 inHg

Overall effects
- Fatalities: 275–279
- Damage: $13 million (1915 USD)
- Areas affected: Trinidad and Tobago, Windward Islands, Leeward Antilles, Venezuela, Colombia, Jamaica, Honduras, Cayman Islands, Cuba, Yucatán Peninsula, Louisiana, Mississippi, Alabama, Tennessee, Kentucky, West Virginia, Pennsylvania and Mexico
- IBTrACS
- Part of the 1915 Atlantic hurricane season

The New Orleans Hurricane of 1915 was an intense Category 4 hurricane that made landfall near Grand Isle, Louisiana, and the most intense tropical cyclone during the 1915 Atlantic hurricane season. The storm formed in late September, when it moved westward and peaked in intensity with 145 mph (233 km/h) in sustained winds. It then weakened slightly by the time of landfall on September 29, with recorded wind speeds of 126 mph (203 km/h) as a strong Category 3 storm. The hurricane killed an estimated 275 people and caused $13 million (1915 USD) in damage.

== Meteorological history ==
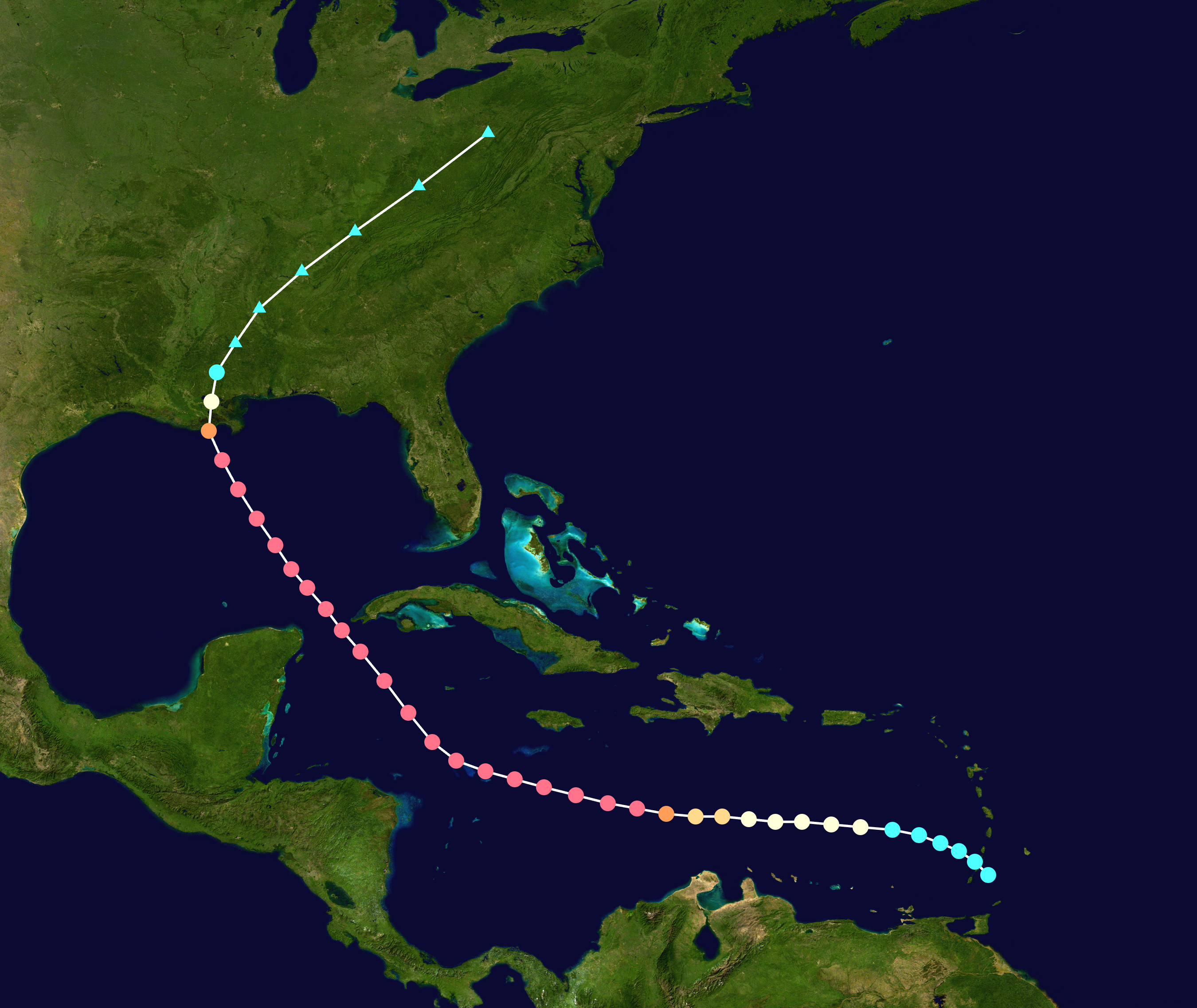
Map plotting the storm's track and intensity, according to the Saffir–Simpson scale Map key Saffir–Simpson scale Tropical depression (≤38 mph, ≤62 km/h) Tropical storm (39–73 mph, 63–118 km/h) Category 1 (74–95 mph, 119–153 km/h) Category 2 (96–110 mph, 154–177 km/h) Category 3 (111–129 mph, 178–208 km/h) Category 4 (130–156 mph, 209–251 km/h) Category 5 (≥157 mph, ≥252 km/h) Unknown Storm type Tropical cyclone Subtropical cyclone Extratropical cyclone, remnant low, tropical disturbance, or monsoon depression

According to the Atlantic hurricane reanalysis project, the 1915 New Orleans hurricane began as a weak tropical storm moving across the southern Windward Islands on September 21, 1915. Its tropical cyclogenesis was determined via analysis of atmospheric observations from the surrounding islands, though shipping in the region would confirm the storm's existence the following day. Tracking slowly towards the west, the nascent tropical cyclone gradually strengthened, reaching hurricane intensity by 00:00 UTC on September 23. This steady phase of intensification would continue unhindered as the hurricane trekked across the Caribbean Sea, allowing the storm to reach major hurricane strength on September 24. At 12:00 UTC the next day, the cyclone's maximum sustained winds crested at 145 mph (233 km/h), making it a powerful Category 4 hurricane if rated using the modern-day Saffir–Simpson hurricane wind scale; the storm would maintain winds of this scale for over three days.

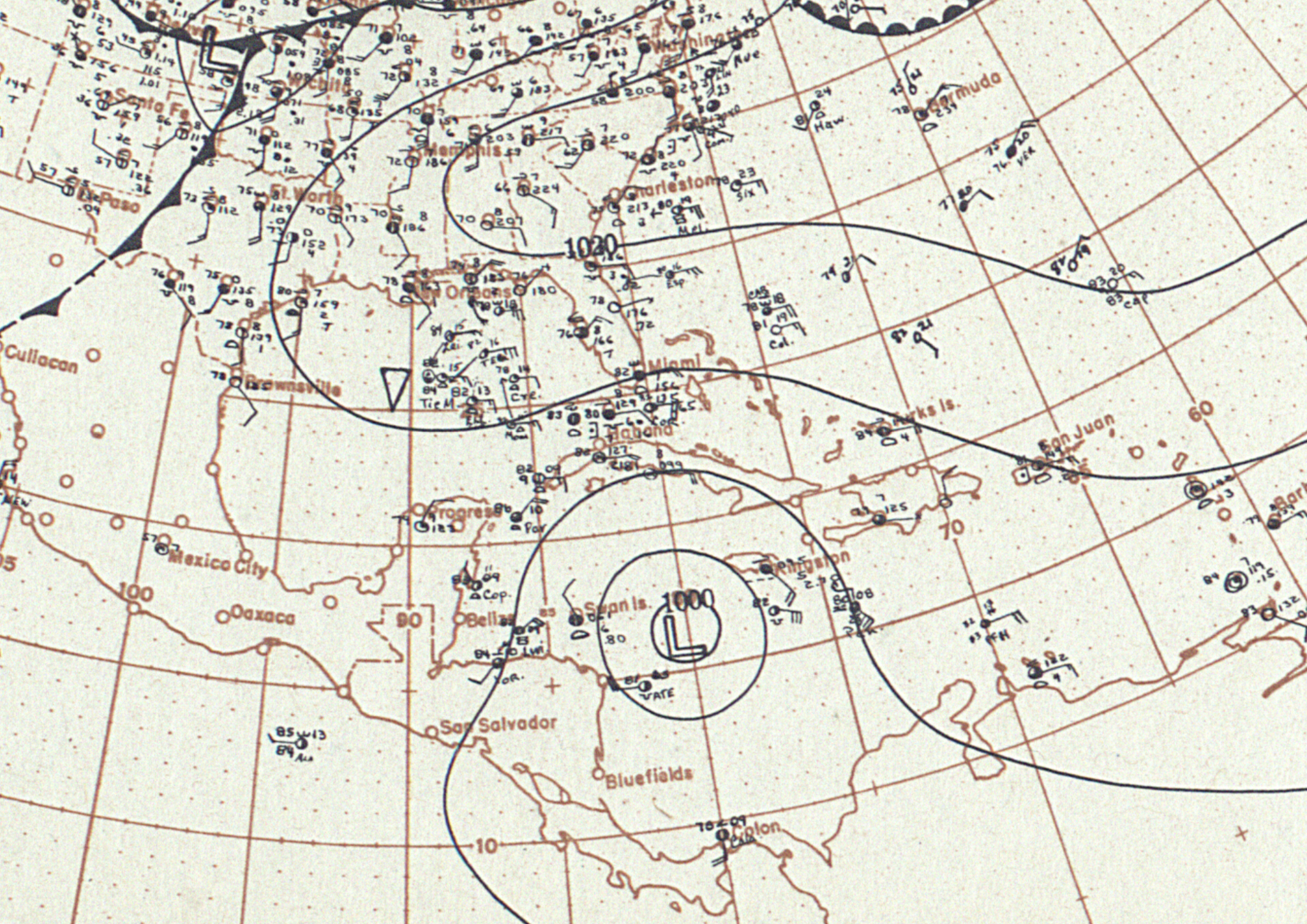
Weather map of the hurricane over the Western Caribbean Sea on September 26

One ship observation, estimated to have been likely taken late on September 25, documented a barometric pressure of 931 mbar (hPa; 27.50 inHg). This pressure reading would stand as the lowest taken during the hurricane's lifespan, and also suggested that the storm's initially assessed intensity—equivalent to a modern-day Category 2 hurricane—was significantly underestimated. As the cyclone passed south of Jamaica, it curved towards the northwest, taking it towards the Yucatán Channel. By September 28, the storm had entered the Gulf of Mexico.

The hurricane maintained its gradual forward speed and fairly steady intensity as it approached the Louisiana coast. As the cyclone neared land, it entered a denser area of shipping traffic, allowing the storm's intensity to be more readily assessed. Slight weakening occurred as the storm moved over shallower continental shelf waters, leading up to the hurricane's landfall on the Gulf coast of Louisiana at 18:00 UTC on September 29. The hurricane's strongest winds upon landfall were estimated to measure 125 mph (201 km/h), correlating with the upper-end of a Category 3 rating on the modern-day Saffir–Simpson hurricane wind scale. Near the time of landfall, the hurricane was documented as having a central pressure of 952 mbar (952 hPa; 28.1 inHg) at Tulane University.

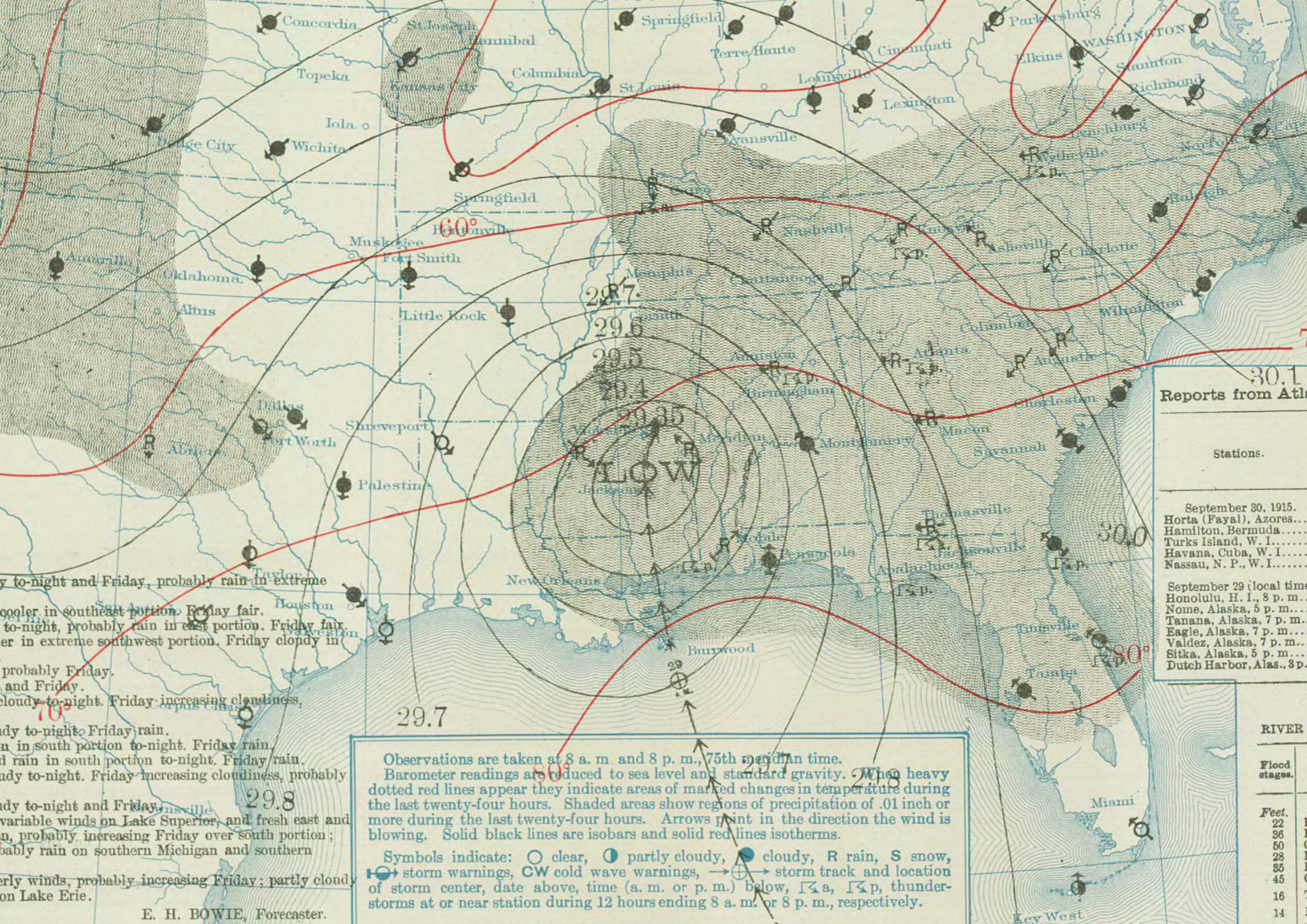
Weather map of the hurricane over land on September 30

At the time, this was the lowest pressure ever recorded in the United States. Using this measurement, the Atlantic reanalysis project calculated that the hurricane struck Louisiana with a lower pressure: 944 mbar (944 hPa; 27.9 inHg). Analysis of onshore observations also suggested that the storm made landfall with concentric eyewalls. Although the moist swampland of the Louisianan Acadiana allowed the hurricane to maintain strength longer than what would otherwise be expected, the storm would eventually succumb to land interaction. Rapid weakening ensued as the cyclone moved inland, degrading back into a tropical storm within twelve hours of landfall. As it entered Mississippi, the storm began to interact with a quasi-stationary front. This resulted in the formation of a new low-pressure center and denoted the transition from a tropical to extratropical cyclone at 12:00 UTC on September 30; and these remnants advanced northeastward into the Mid-Atlantic states before they were last noted on October 1 over Pennsylvania.

== Preparations ==
=== United States ===
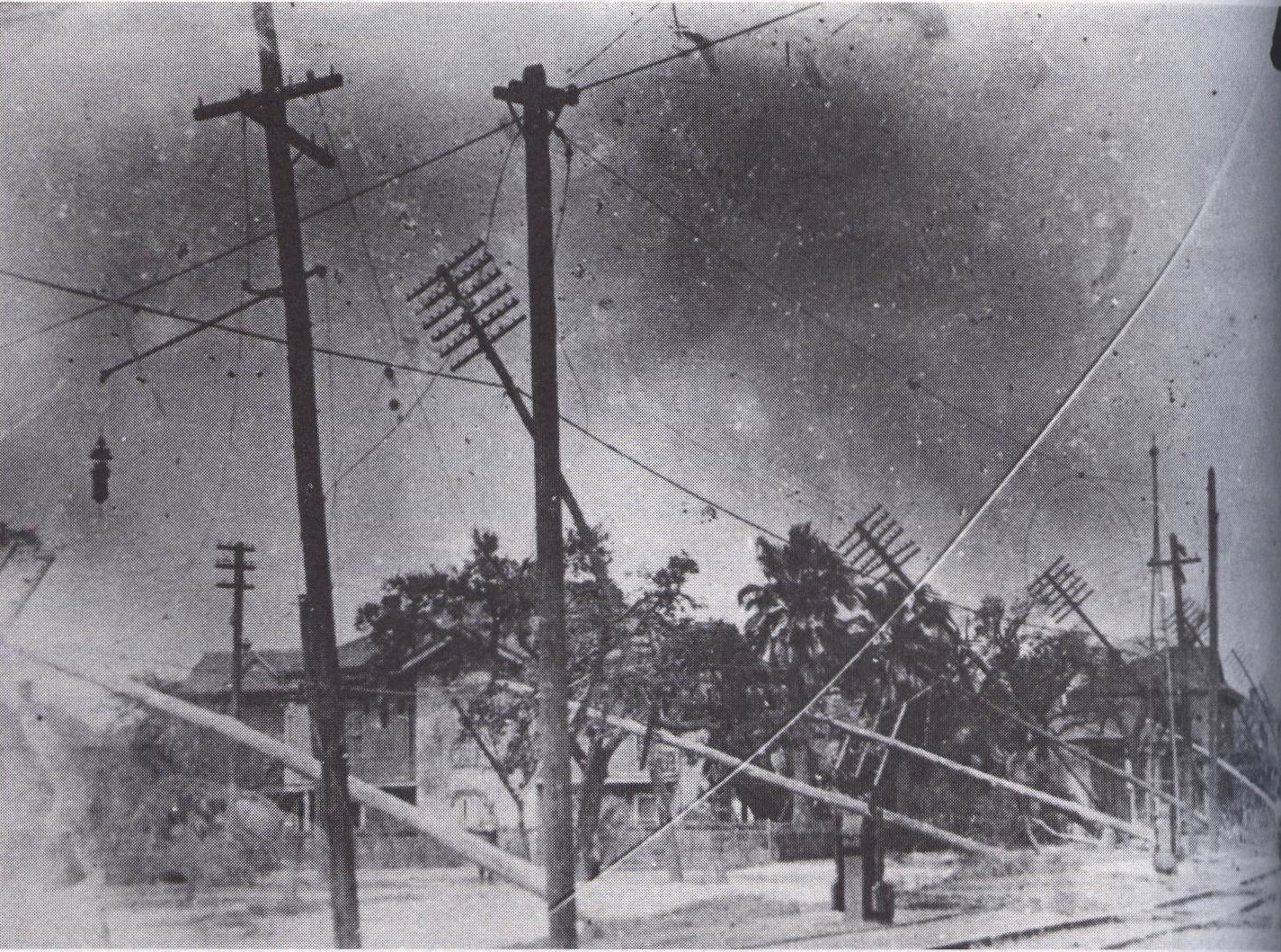
A series of downed utility poles in New Orleans after the hurricane

As potential impacts on the United States became more clear, the Weather Bureau issued storm warnings for virtually the entire extent of the Eastern Seaboard from Eastport, Maine southward to the Florida coast on September 27. Storm warnings for the Louisiana coast—where the hurricane would eventually make landfall—were first issued by the Weather Bureau on the morning of September 28 and disseminated via telegraph and mail. That afternoon, a hurricane warning was issued for coastal regions of the Gulf of Mexico from Pensacola, Florida to New Orleans, Louisiana. Extensive efforts to communicate the imminent threat the hurricane posed began in earnest following the issuance of warnings for the area, with public interests being advised that the approaching storm could be stronger than the 1909 Grand Isle hurricane, which served as New Orleans' strongest documented tropical cyclone at the time. Warnings continued into September 29, and local emergency offices enforced strict curfews for New Orleans as landfall approached; meteorologist Isaac Cline stated in an entry to the Monthly Weather Review that the effective dissemination of warnings and strict enforcement of curfew "unquestionably" mitigated additional loss of life in the city.

== Impacts ==
=== Caribbean Sea ===
Owing to the scarcity of shipping traffic across much of the Caribbean Sea, the storm's intensity and potential track were difficult to assess early in its lifetime. Light rain from the system fell far north in Puerto Rico and the Turks and Caicos Islands, with the latter reporting 0.23 in (5.8 mm) of rain. As the storm passed south of Jamaica, strong gales were felt in Kingston, Jamaica. Some winds were strong enough to cut telecommunications between Kingston and the outlying districts of the island nation. The hurricane's brushing of Jamaica led in part to raising cotton prices to a yearly high. Offshore, the United Fruit steamer Almirante sustained considerable damage but was able to return safely to Port Royal. Ships sailing for the Yucatán Channel and in western Cuban waters were warned to exercise extreme caution following the hurricane's passage of Jamaica. Winds peaked at 36 mph (58 km/h) in Havana, Cuba as the storm passed through the channel well to the city's west.

=== Gulf of Mexico and Louisiana ===
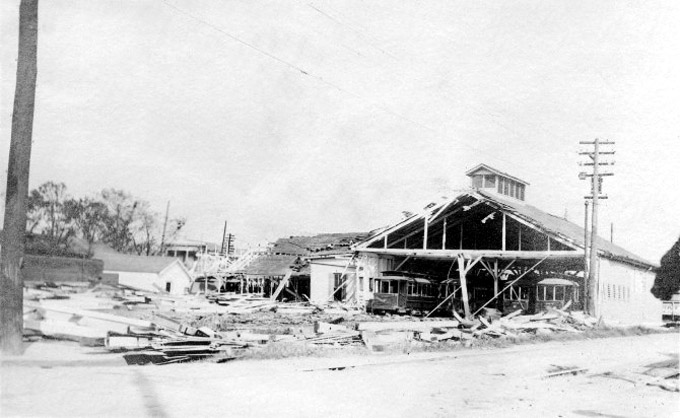
The Poland Station streetcar barn (at Uptown river corner of Poland & St. Claude Avenues) shows significant damage from the hurricane.

As the hurricane traversed the Gulf of Mexico from September 28 to September 29, it produced rough surf along its path. The cutter Miami was caught in the storm, but was able to use a heavily damaged ship as an anchor before resuming its trek towards Key West, Florida. Storm surge and rough seas produced by the hurricane along the Louisiana coast arrived shortly before the storm made landfall. Evacuees departing the coast as late as September 28 reported no abnormal tides along the shore. However, sea levels began to rise at abnormally rapid rates on the morning of September 29 as the hurricane neared. By the afternoon, low-lying lands south of New Orleans and east towards Bay St. Louis, Mississippi, as well as areas adjacent to Lake Pontchartrain, were inundated by the quickly rising storm surge. Levee overtopping along Lake Pontchartrain resulted in the flooding of much of western New Orleans. Parts of Carrollton, New Orleans, were submerged under as much as 8 ft (2.4 m) of water due to the levee failure, and much of this inundation remained for up to four days as the city's drainage system slowly drained the floodwaters; in other locations, floodwaters receded rapidly. At its height, the surge was estimated to have crested between 15 and 20 ft (4.6 and 6.1 m) in height, setting a record for the highest tide reported in the region. Ocean swells topped levees along the Mississippi River and progressed well upstream; at the confluence of the Harvey Canal and the Mississippi River nearly 100 mi (160 km) from the Gulf of Mexico, the river swelled to 6 ft (1.8 m) above normal. Elsewhere, waves 10–12 ft (3.0–3.7 m) above normal high tide were reported along the same river.

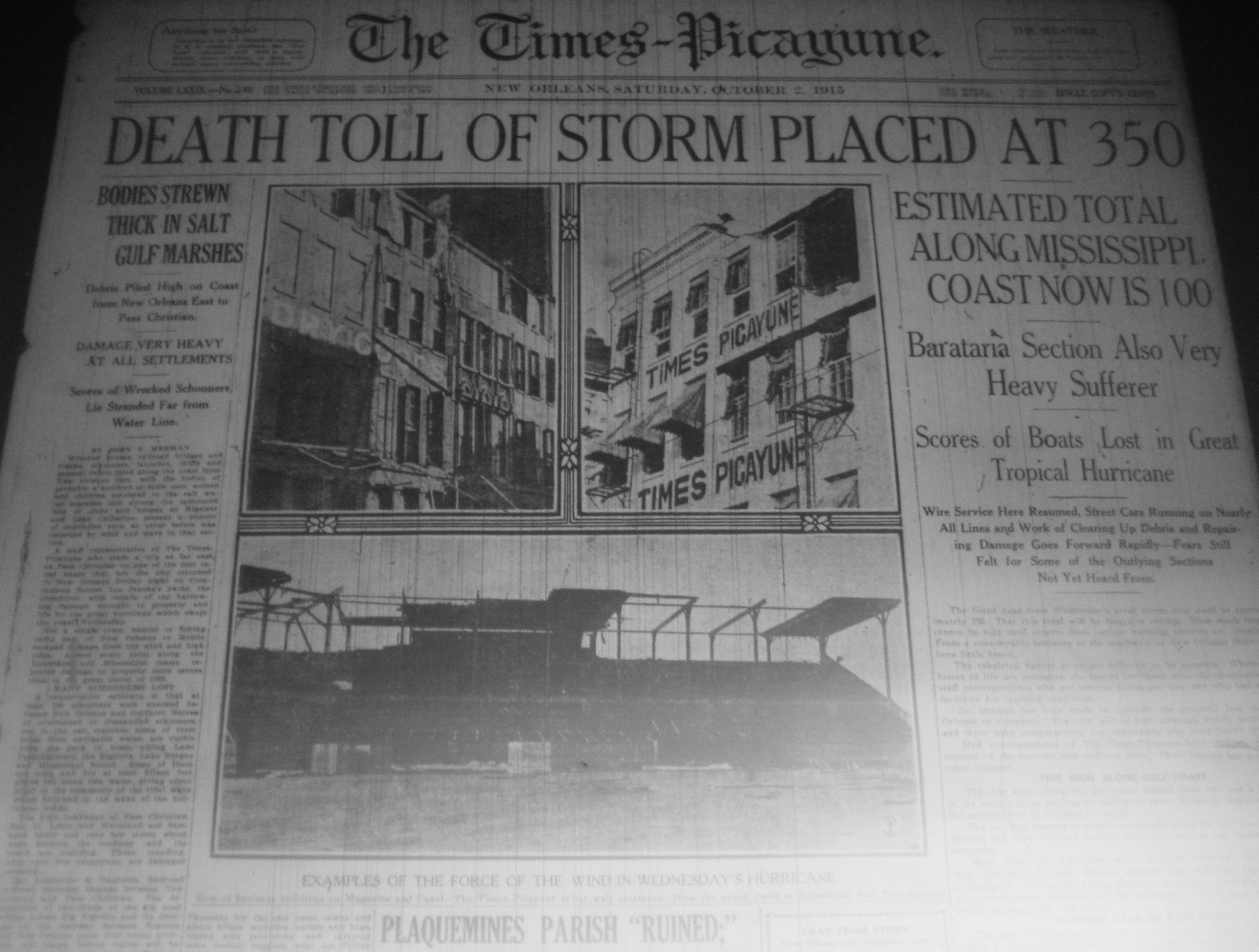
Front page of the Times-Picayune newspaper in New Orleans, Louisiana, on October 2, just a few days after the hurricane made landfall

Upon making landfall, onshore anemometers documented winds stronger than had been recorded in any previous hurricane along the United States Gulf Coast. Gusts as high as 130 mph (210 km/h) were reported in New Orleans, with five-minute sustained winds peaking at 86 mph (138 km/h). In Burrwood, Louisiana, a Weather Bureau anemometer documented peak five-minute sustained wind speeds of 122 mph (196 km/h), though when the abnormally high bias of the era's anemometers and adjustment to the more standard one-minute sustained measure are accounted for, this yields a speed of 99 mph (159 km/h). The intense winds caused extensive damage across New Orleans, where nearly every building sustained damage. The French Market was partly demolished, while the roof of a prominent Masonic temple partially collapsed.

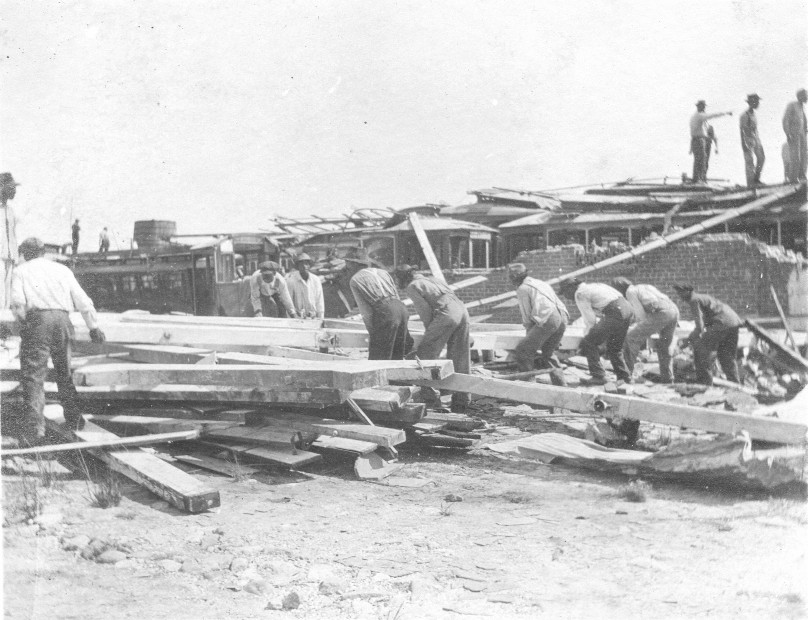
Workers clearing up debris at the Poland Station streetcar barn in New Orleans after the hurricane

Combined with powerful waves, the winds resulted in the sinking of four small steamers at the Port of New Orleans, in addition to several coal barges. A number of other steamers and small craft were blown from bayous and bays onto dry land. The winds also caused widespread power outages, cutting telecommunications to and from the city, and putting over 8000 telephones out of commission. Electric lighting was also disabled by the storm following the failure of city's power station. Damage to city-owned property in New Orleans was appraised at nearly US$500,000, though the total amount of damage to all public and private property in the city was estimated to have been at least ten times greater at US$5 million. Damage to shipping along the Mississippi River in and around New Orleans was estimated at US$1.75 million. Following the storm's passage, rail service to New Orleans was suspended.

Roofs were blown off buildings and the Presbytère on Jackson Square lost its cupola. The clock on St. Louis Cathedral stopped at 5:50pm, the height of the storm. The hurricane damaged the Times-Picayune building, hampering newspaper production. More church steeples in the city were blown down or significantly damaged than remained intact.

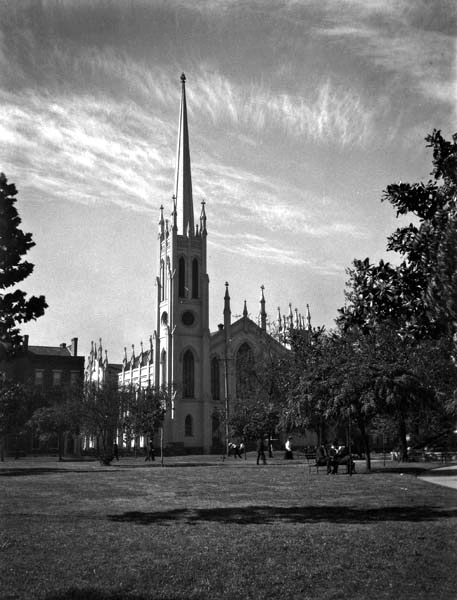
First Presbyterian Church on Lafayette Square was destroyed by the great hurricane of 1915, collapsing at 5:02 pm.

The landmark Presbyterian Church on Lafayette Square collapsed, as did St. Anna's Episcopal Church on Esplanade Avenue. Half the rides at Spanish Fort were destroyed. Horticultural Hall in Audubon Park was destroyed. Wind damage was worse than the most recent previous hurricane to hit the city in 1909, but flooding was much less widespread; however, there were reports of waters from Lake Pontchartrain being forced backwards into the city's drainage canals by the storm, an event which would be repeated more catastrophically with Hurricane Katrina 90 years later. After power to drainage pumps failed, parts of the Mid-City neighborhood suffered significant flooding. Only 21 of the storm-related deaths were within the city.

The hurricane also caused significant damage in areas around New Orleans, including the destruction of 90% of buildings destroyed along Lake Pontchartrain. Only one house remained standing in Leeville, Louisiana; similar destruction occurred between Golden Meadow, Louisiana and Cut Off, Louisiana, where 100 houses were demolished. In Morgan City, Louisiana, winds of 75 mph (121 km/h) blew down wires and crippled communication. The total damage to infrastructure in areas surrounding New Orleans was estimated at US$6.5 million. The heaviest rain fell within an area 25 mi (40 km) east of the center, though heavy rainfall occurred throughout the eastern half of the tropical cyclone as it moved inland.

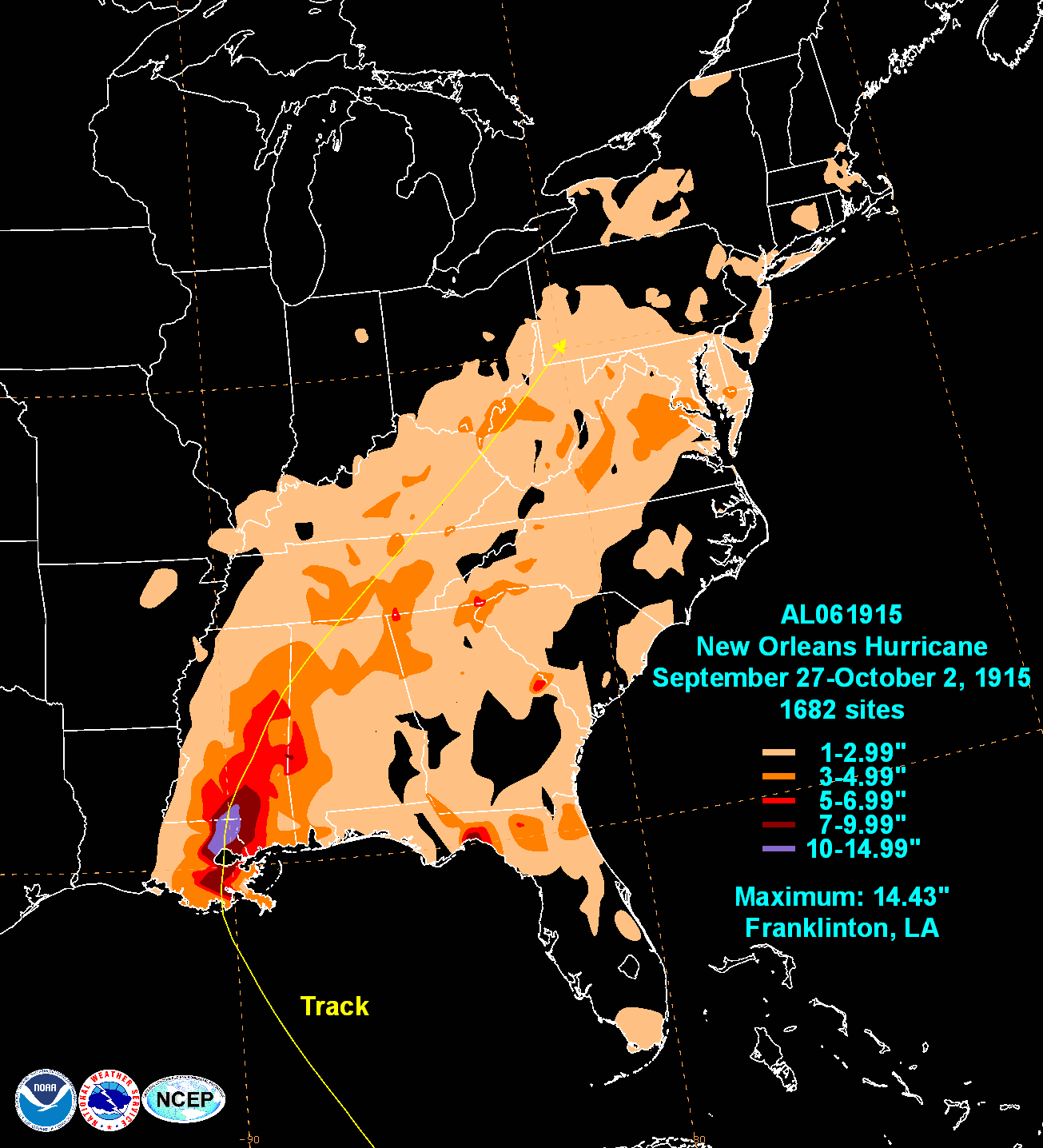
Total rainfall from the hurricane

Franklin, Louisiana measured the highest rainfall associated with the storm with a reading of 14.43 in (36.7 cm); on September 30, 10.28 in (26.1 cm) of rain fell in Franklin, setting a September 24-hour rainfall record for the city. Precipitation spread ahead of the hurricane as it interacted with a stationary front draped over the Southeastern United States, causing widespread rainfall totals in excess of 3 in (7.6 cm) across much of Mississippi and Alabama. A 13-foot (4.0 m) storm surge rolled into St. Bernard Parish, the Rigolets, and the Lake Catherine area.

Areas along the Lower Coast (south of New Orleans) were hit even harder than the city. A telegraph report states the situation:

Whole country between Poydras and Buras inundated. Levees gone, property loss appalling. Life toll probably heavy. Conditions estimated worse than ever before. Relief needed. No communications...

There were 23 dead in Venice, Louisiana, with similar numbers in coastal towns of Frenier and LaBranche. Plaquemines Parish experienced the worst fatalities with deaths estimated at over 200; the bodies of some victims were never found. In Plaquemines Parish, there was severe flooding and miles of levees were washed away. Thousands of people were left homeless. The hurricane also wrecked many of the oyster boats, damaging the local economy.

Some communities, including Breton Island and the town of Saint Malo, were completely destroyed.

Though it was not as deadly as the 1893 Chenier Caminanda hurricane, this hurricane was the deadliest Louisiana hurricane until Betsy 50 years later.

=== Alabama, Florida, and Mississippi ===
Early reports that streets in Biloxi, Mississippi, were inundated under 6 ft (1.8 m) were initially denied by Louisville and Nashville Railroad dispatchers. Mobile, Alabama did not experience significant damage as winds remained under 50 mph (80 km/h). A local train carrying relief supplies from Mobile was sent to affected areas, though most train service in the region was suspended.

== See also ==
- List of Atlantic hurricanes
- List of Category 4 Atlantic hurricanes
- 1909 Grand Isle hurricane – Deadly hurricane that struck similar areas of Louisiana, causing at least 400 deaths
- 1926 Louisiana hurricane – Caused widespread damage across southern Louisiana
- Hurricane Hilda (1964) – Slow-moving and powerful hurricane that spawned several damaging tornadoes across Louisiana
- Hurricane Betsy (1965) – Made landfall in Louisiana as a powerful Category 4 hurricane, causing widespread damage
- Hurricane Katrina (2005) – Made landfall in southeastern Louisiana as a massive major hurricane, causing over 1000 deaths and becoming the costliest tropical cyclone on record
- Hurricane Ida (2021) – Destructive Category 4 hurricane that caused widespread damage in southeastern Louisiana
