= List of villages in Tirunelveli district =

This is an alphabetical list of villages in Tirunelveli district, Tamil Nadu, India.

== A ==
- Adaichani
- Ambalam
- Anaikulam
- Anaikutiyur
- Appankoil
- Arikesavanallur
- Ariyanayagipuram
- Athuvazhi
- Avaraikulam
- Avudaiyanoor

== B-I ==
- Brahmadesam
- Chempadu
- Deivaseyalpuram
- Dharugapuram
- Ittamozhi

== K ==
- Kadambankulam
- Kadanganeri
- Kadayam
- Kalangathakandy
- Kalathimadam
- Kalikumarapuram
- Kallikulam
- Kaluneerkulam
- Kandithankulam
- Keezha Thiruvenkatanathapuram
- Kizha Ambur
- Kizhanatham
- Kodaganallur
- Kootapuli
- Kothaiseri
- Kovankulam
- Kulakkattakurichi
- Kurumbalaperi
- Kurumbalapperi
- Kurumbapapperi
- Kuruvikulam
- Kuthenkully
- Kuthukalvalasai
- Kuttam

== M ==
- Manur
- Mangudi
- Mannarkovil
- Mariathaipuram
- Maruthur
- Mathaganeri
- Mela Ilandaikulam
- Mela Thiruvenkatanathapuram
- Melapalayam
- Muthukrishnaperi
- Mylappapuram

== O-R ==
- Odaikkarai
- Odaimarichan
- Oormelalagiyan
- Pallakkal Pothukudi
- Pavanasapuram
- Pavoorchatram
- Perumal Nagar
- Poovankurichi
- Pudupatti
- Rengasamudram

== S ==
- Sambankulam
- Sathirakondan
- Seeniyapuram
- Sembikulam
- Singamparai
- Singampathu
- Singikulam
- Sivalarkulam
- Sivasailam
- Soundrapandiapuram
- Sri Renga Narayana Puram
- Subramaniapuram
- Suthamalli
- Suviseshapuram

== T-V ==
- Thachanallur
- Thambithoppu
- Thayar Thoppu
- Thenkalam
- Uthumalai
- Vellakulam
- Ventrilingapuram
- Veppilankulam
- Thirukkurangudi
