= Tirunelveli Tamil =

Dialect of Tamil

Tirunelveli Tamil also known as Nellai Tamil or ThenPaandi Tamil is one of the dialects of Tamil which is spoken in the districts of Tirunelveli, Tenkasi, Thoothukudi, Kanyakumari and some parts of Virudhunagar as well as over the vast area of south Tamil Nadu which was once ruled by the Pandiya Kings. Nellai Tamil is also known as Thenpaandi Tamil. Thenpaandi Seemai refers to the part of a Pandya kingdom which includes the present day Kanyakumari, Tirunelveli, Tenkasi and Tuticorin, some parts of Ramanathapuram, Virudunagar Districts.It differs substantially from Madurai Tamil

== Features ==
The Tirunelveli Tamil Dialect (TTD) has on the whole 41 phonemes of which 31 are segmental and the remaining 10 are suprasegmental. Nellai Tamil also preserves archaic kinship terms that other dialects have long discarded. However, the most unusual feature of the Tamil spoken in the Tirunelveli region is that the medial "c" is pronounced as a voiceless palatal affricate as in Old Tamil and has not undergone the change to the dental "s" as in most other dialects.

== Regions of Nellai Tamil ==
- Tirunelveli
- Sankarankovil
- Palayamkottai
- Tuticorin
- Kovilpatti
- Melapalayam
- Sriviliputhur
- Cheranmahadevi
- Poovankurichi
- Sivagiri
- Tenkasi
- Rajapalayam
- Sivakasi
- Srivilliputhur
- Eruvadi
- Vasudevanallur
- Kalakkad
- Ilanji
- Sambavar vadakarai
- Surandai
- Panpoli
- Vadakarai
- Ambasamudram
- Kallidaikurichi
- Uppuvaniamuthur
- Kadayam
- Alangulam
- Thiruchendur
- Manadu
- Ezuvaraimukki
- Srivaikundam
- Nazareth
- Udangudi
- Thisayanvilai
- Kuttam
- Nanguneri
- Kanganankulam
- Kadayanallur
- Radhapuram
- Sathankulam
- Valliyur
- Panagudi
- Pavoorchatram
- Thippanampatty
- Sengottai
- Sivanadanoor
- Kurumbalaperi
- Puliyankudi
- Vickramasingapuram
- Papanasam
- Kadayanallur
- Kazhugumalai
- Uvari
- Peikulam
- Melaseval
- Pattamadai
- Aruppukottai
- Kanyakumari
- Nagercoil
- Aralvaimozhi
- Rajapalayam
- Sriviliputhur
- Tiruchuli
- Sivakasi

== Peculiar Nellai Tamil Words/ Phrases ==
- அன்னாச்சி (aṉṉācci) = Used to call a person of respect
- எப்படி இருக்கீய? (yĕppaḍi irukkīya) = How are you? (with respect)
- சுவம் (cuvam) = wellness (from சுகம்; சுவம், சோம் forms are found in other dialects)
- சுவமா இருக்கியாலா? (cuvamā irukkiyālā) = Are you doing well?, Are you in good health? (with respect)
- சுவம்தானா? (cuvamtānā) = Are you doing well?
- தூரமா? (tūramā) = Going somewhere far?
- Elei, Yala, Yelu = Dude
- Kooruketta = Without sharpness of mind
- Yennala Panutha = What are you doing dude?
- Yabla = Feminine of Yela - Used to call a girl (without respect)
- Aveyn Cholludhamle = He says (without respect)
- Naa Cholludhamla = I am telling you (without respect)
- Payaluva = Boys
- Podusu = Little one (child)
- Payavulla = Fellow (akin to 'homie')/ Son of (e.g.: Pya Payavulla means Son of a Demon)
- Pileyl = Girls
- Pottachi = A girl (without respect)
- Avanuvol, Ivanuvol = Those guys, These guys
- Penjathi/ Ponjathi = Wife
- Engana? = Where?
- Inganakula = Nearby
- Anganakula = Within there
- Nikki = (something is) waiting / standing
- Pidikki = to like, (something is) holding
- Vaaren = I'm coming
- ...pla = it seems - used as a suffice to personal verbs (e.g.) Vanthapla = He/she came, Chonnapla = He/She told
- Choli = Work
- Choliyatthu = Without any work
- Andhaanikku = So
- Kalavaani = Thief
- Aviya/ Avuha, Iviya/ Ivuha = Him (respectful form - third person singular), They (also used for third person plural)
- Thoraval = Key
- Pydha = Type/ Wheel
- Payya = Slowly
- Anthaala = Likewise(Appadiye)
- Kaangala = Not found(Kaanum)
- Thaai = Younger sister(thangachi)
- Osaka = Above (at a higher place)
- Yekka= Elder Sister
- Kottikaren = Fool
- Vaariyal = Sweeper
- Anney = Elder Brother
- Atthaan/ Machaan = Brother-in-law, cousin brother
- Anni/ Maini/ Mathini = Sister-in-law (wife's elder sister/ elder brother's wife), cousin sister
- Maini= Sister-in-law (wife's elder sister) in some cases maternal uncle's elder daughter
- Kolunthiya = Sister-in-law (husband's younger sister)
- Machi/ Mottamaadi = Terrace
- Nadumatthi = Exact centre
- Appadi podu aruvala! = Attaboy! (Lit. Put your machete like that!)
- Adichan gosu! = What a response!

== Movies featuring Nellai Tamil ==
Nellai Tamil has been used in a number of Tamil movies. Some of them are Seevalaperi Pandi, Dum Dum Dum, Saamy, Ayya, Kovil, Thamiraparani, Roja, Thirunelveli, Kushi, Sillunu Oru Kadhal, Raman Thediya Seethai, Pidichirukku, Shankhar Ooru Rajapalayam, Kannum Kannum, Unakkum Enakkum Something Something, Dasavatharam, Seval, Thoothukudi, Veeramum Eeramum, Gentleman, Anniyan, Saadhu, Pudhu Nellu Pudhu Naatthu, Punnagai Mannan, Velai Kidaichiruchu, Thanneer Thanneer, Angadi Theru, Kadal, Osthee, Singam triology, Asuran (Dhanush Film), Kaala, Attagasam, vaazhai, pariyerum perumal, bison kalamadan, karnan

Kamal Haasan's 2015 movie Papanasam, a remake of the 2013 Malayalam film Drishyam, also features Nellai Tamil.

== Bibliography ==
- A. Kāmāṭcinātan̲ (1969). The Tirunelvēli Tamil dialect. Annamalai University.
