= Kadanganeri =

- Village
- Location in Tamil Nadu, India Kadanganeri (India)
- Coordinates: 8.92°N 77.55°E
- Country: India
- State: Tamil Nadu
- District: Tenkasi
- Elevation: 127 m (417 ft)

Languages
  - Official: Tamil
- Time zone: UTC+5:30 (IST)
- PIN: 627854
- Telephone code: 04633
- Vehicle registration: TN72, TN76
- Sex ratio: 1000 :1055 ♂/♀
- Literacy: 96%
- Lok Sabha constituency: Tirunelveli
- Vidhan Sabha constituency: Alangulam
- Website: www.facebook.com/Kadanganeri

Kadanganeri is a village located at Alangulam Taluk in Tenkasi district of Tamil Nadu, India. Kadanganeri is a Village Panchayat comes under Alangulam block.

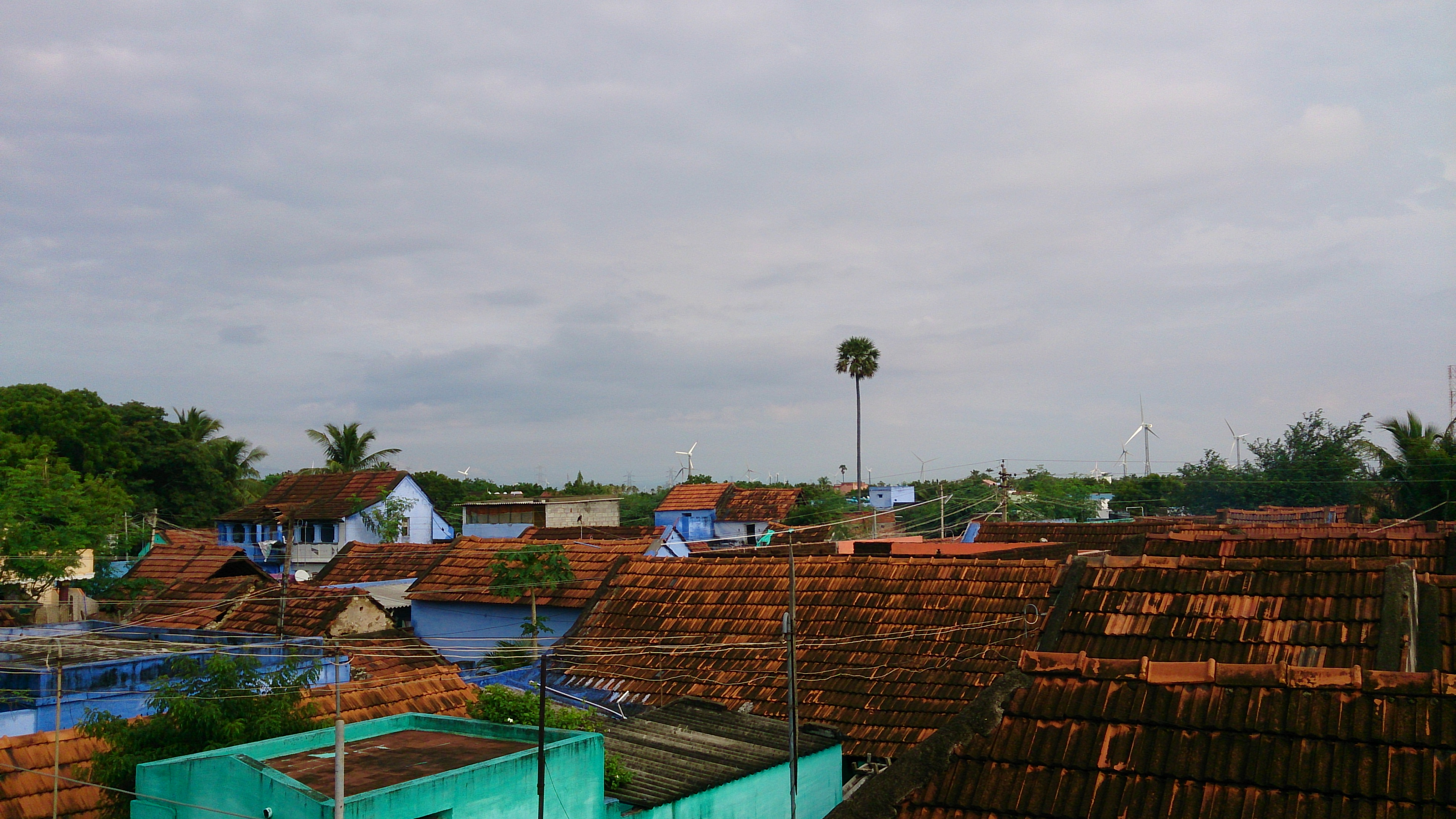
Kadanganeri

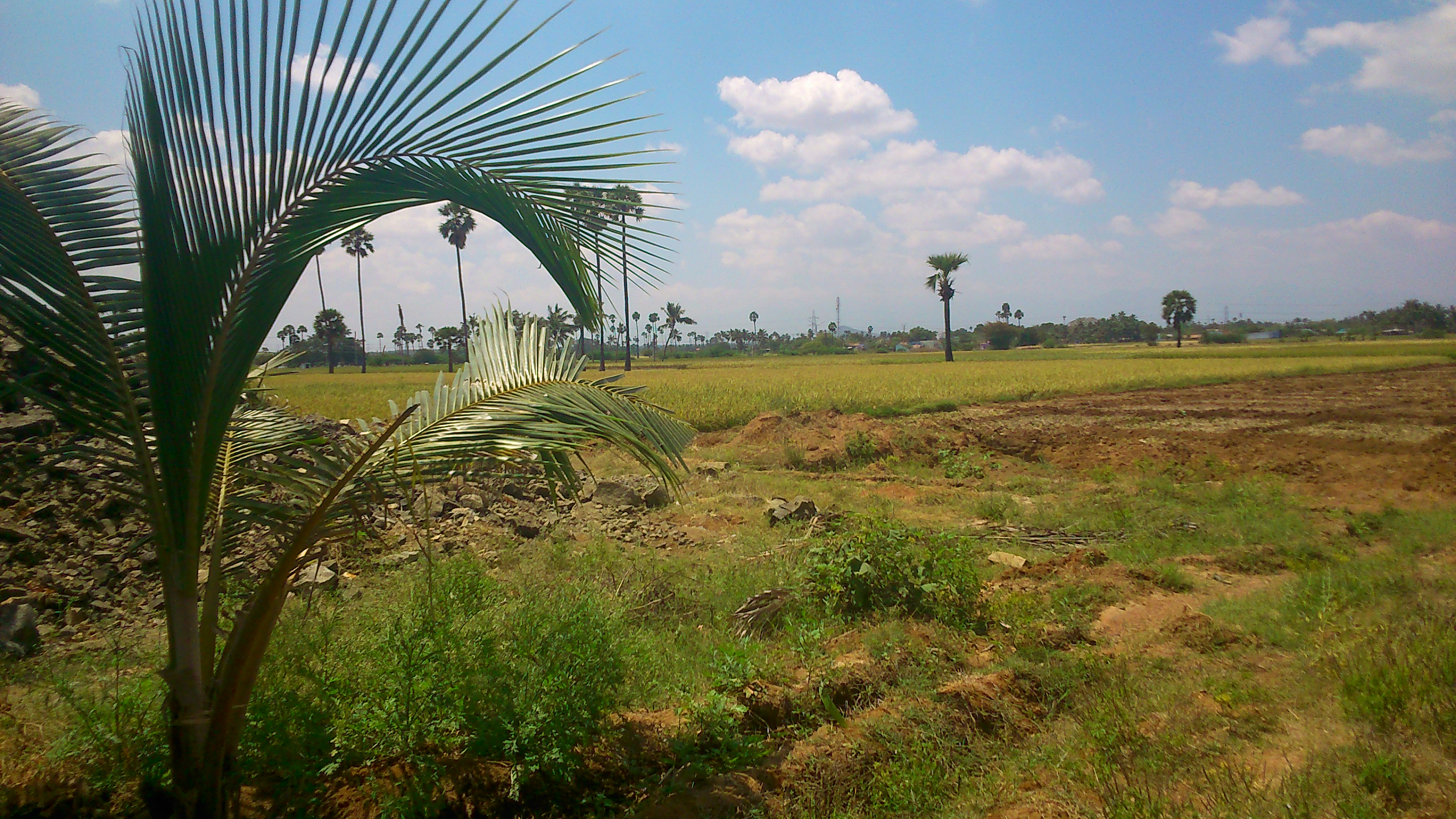
Kadanganeri

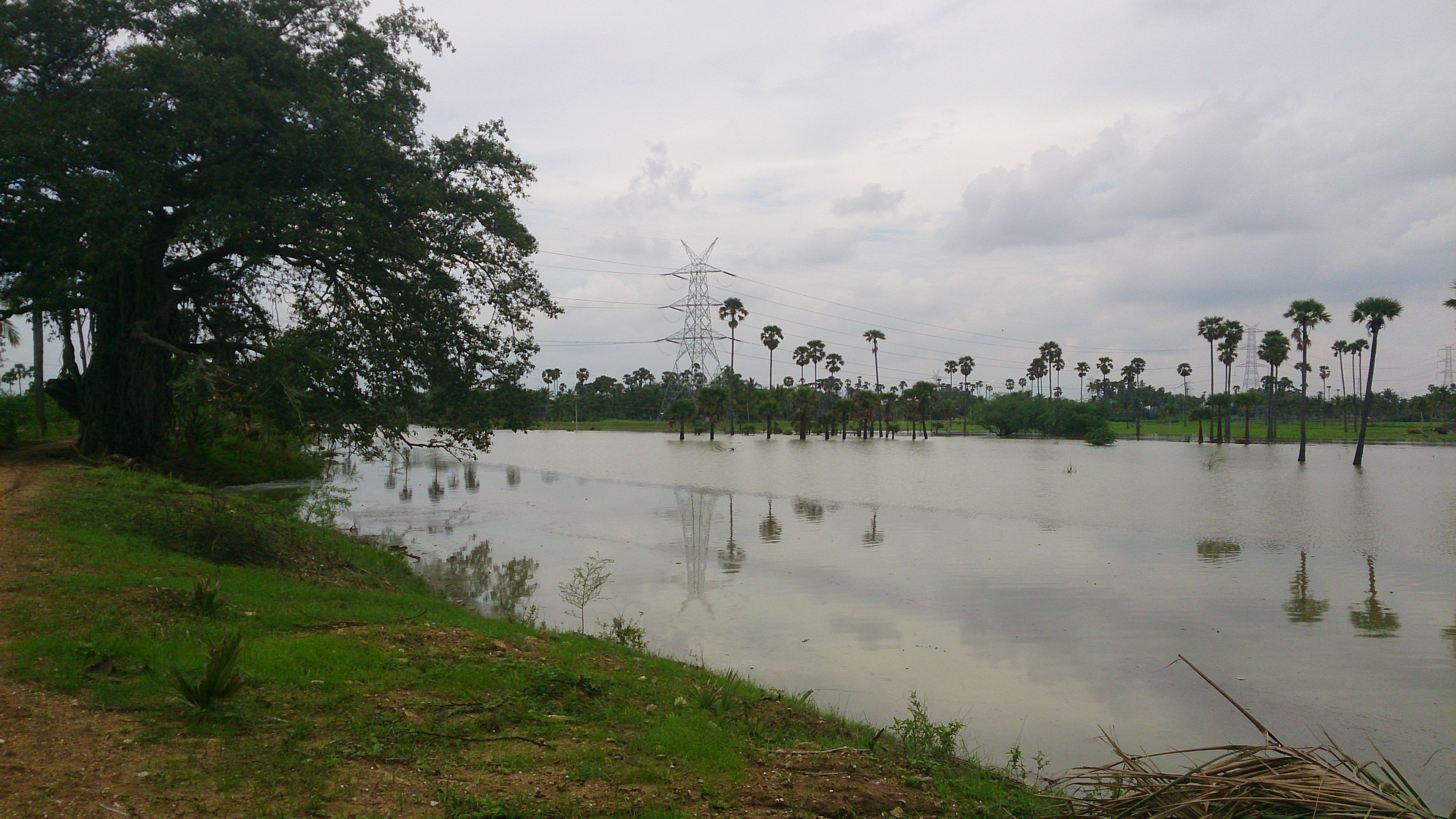
Kadanganeri

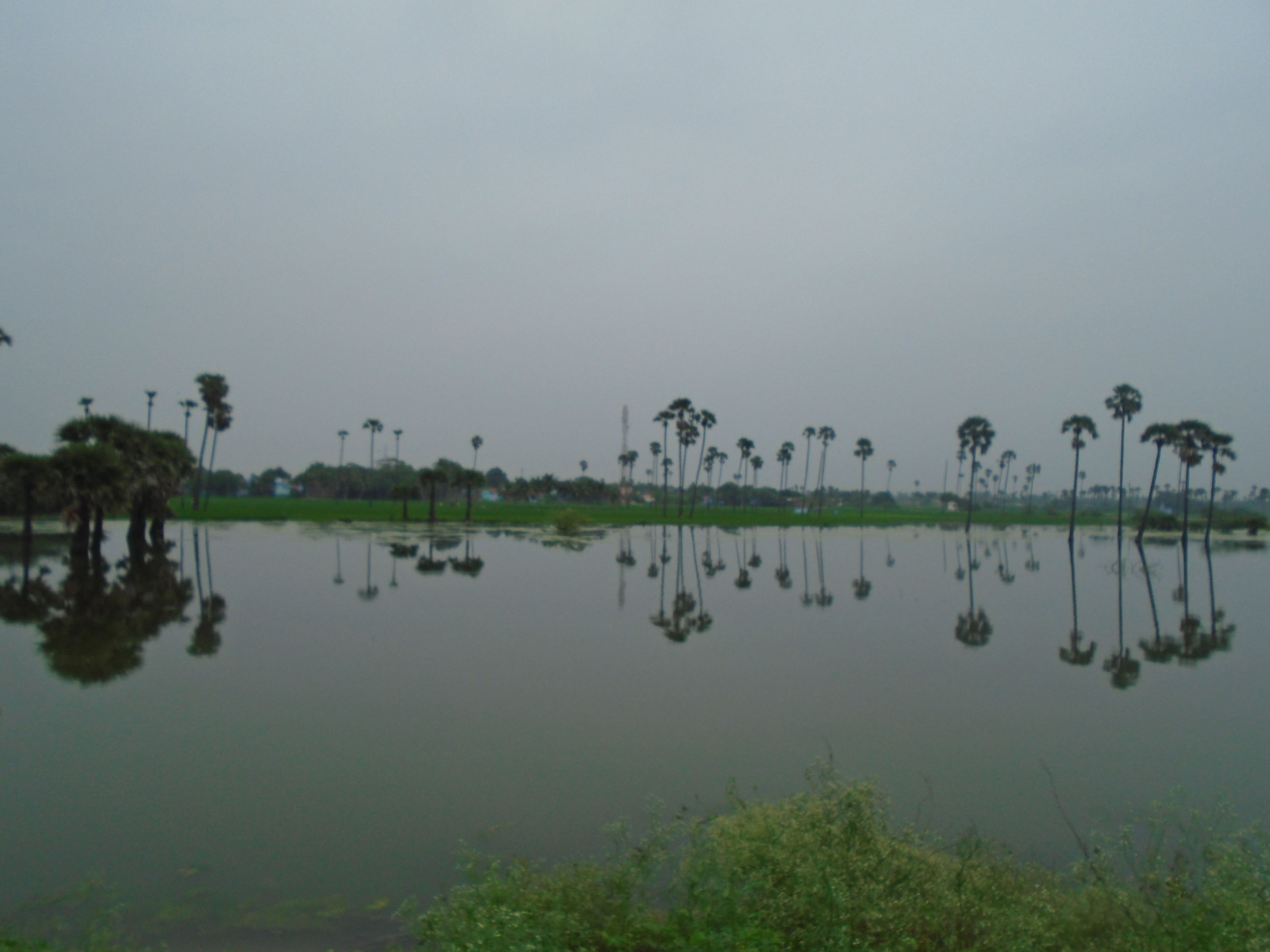
Kadanganeri

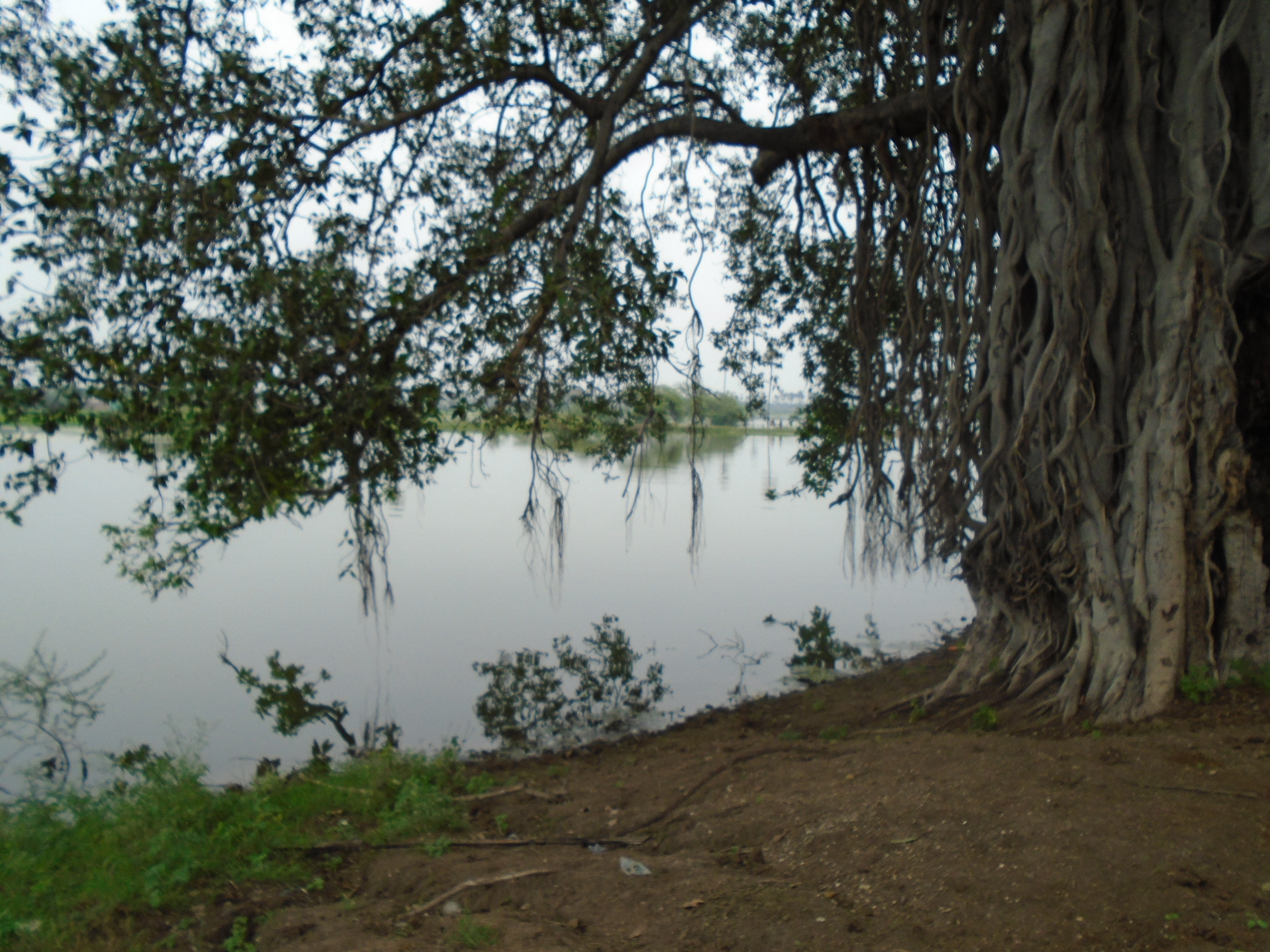
Kadanganeri

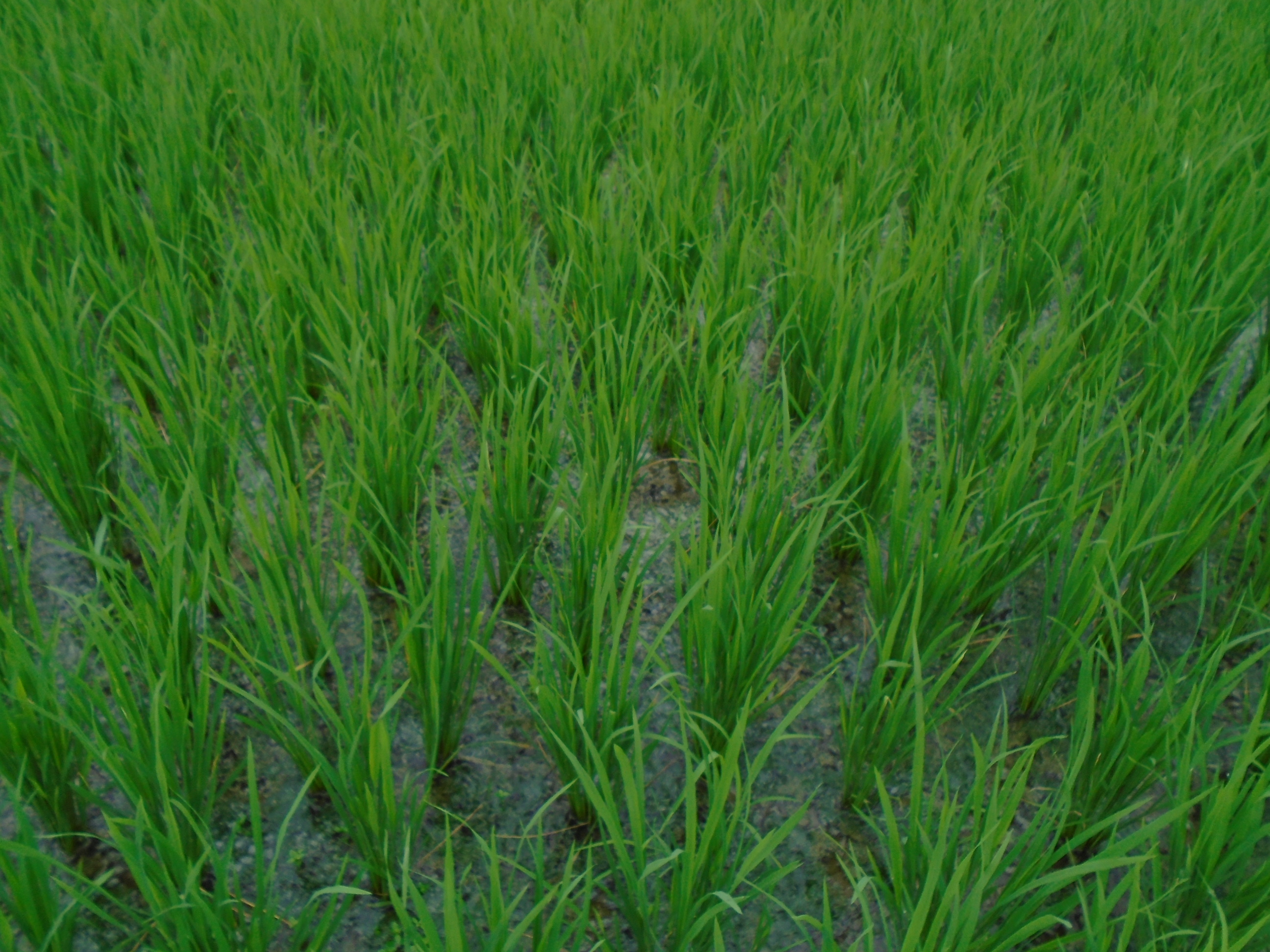
Kadanganeri

== Weather ==
	Temperature in Degree	Temperature in Fahrenheit	Wind Speed
Average	212-370	71.6-98.6	96 km/H

== Population ==
Overall Population is 8250, in this Male is 4092 & Female is 4158 and total households residing are 2224.

== Education ==
Literacy rate in Kadanganeri is good.

=== Schools ===
The village has one primary school, which is named as "Saraswathi Vidhyalaya School" and two Anganwadies for child. Then one Higher Secondary School is placed near to this village named as "Grama Committee Higher Secondary School".

== Temples ==
=== Hindu temples ===
- Amman Kovil
- Ulagamman Kovil
- Karuppasamy Kovil
- Kaikonda Ayyanaar Kovil
- Emperumal Sastha Seevalaperi Sudalai Madan Kovil
- Pillai Valathi Sastha Kovil
- Piraiyadi Madan Kovil
- Pillaiyar Kovil
- Murugan Kovil
- Esakki Amman Kovil
- Sarkkaravittu thiru Kovil
- Kaattu Madan Kovil
- Karguvel Ayyanar Kovil
- Vadakkuthi Amman Kovil
- Kathavarayan kovil
- Sappanimadan kovil

=== Festivals ===
==== Amman Kovil Festival ====
In the month of Panguni (பங்குனி) and Purattaasi (புரட்டாசி), yearly two times.

==== Ulagamman Kovil Festival ====
In the month of Aippasi (ஐப்பசி), yearly one time. Celebrated by Uvari Suyampulinga Sastha Vagayaraakkal

- Main God:
1. Suyampulinga Saasthaa - சுயம்புலிங்க சாஸ்தா

==== Karuppasamy Kovil Festival ====
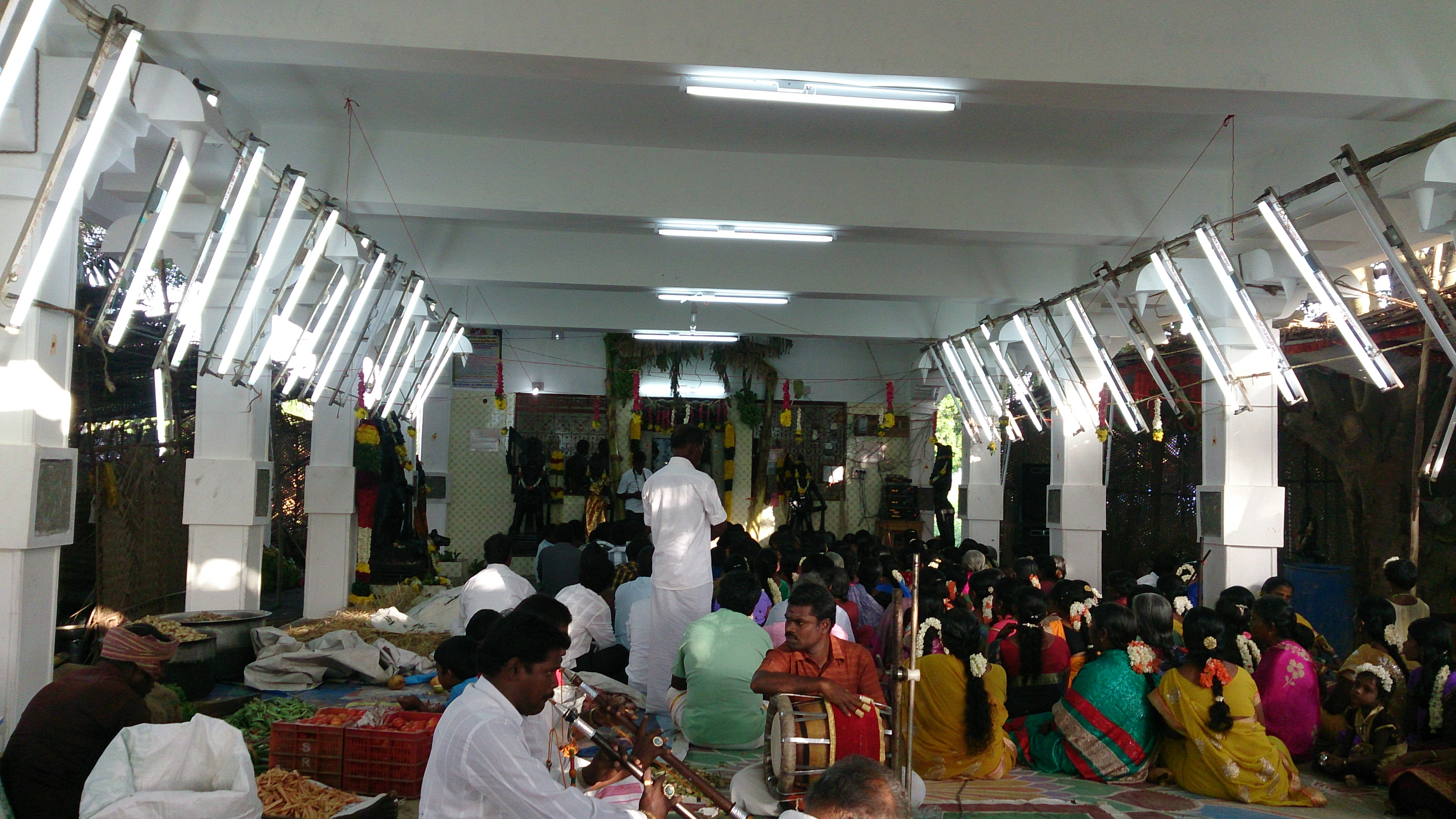
Karuppasamy Temple

In the month of Aadi (ஆடி) temple festival will be Celebrated by Nattamai Vagayaraakkal [Megalinga Sastha Vagayaraakkal]

- Main God:
1. Megalinga Saasthaa - மேகலிங்க சாஸ்தா
2. Karuppasamy - கருப்பசாமி

in the year of 2015, temple was reconstructed and inaugurated on 29JUN2015.

==== Kaikonda Ayyanaar Kovil Festival ====
In the month of Aadi (ஆடி) temple festival will be Celebrated by Kaikonda Ayyanaar Sastha Vagayaraakkal

- Main God:
1. Kaikonda Ayyanaar - கைக்கொண்ட அய்யனார்

==== Em Perumal Sastha Kovil Festival ====
In the month of Aadi (ஆடி) every year, celebrated by Emperumal Sastha Vagayaraakkal

- Main God:
1. Em Perumal Sastha
2. Sudalai Madan - சுடலை மாடன்

==== Pillai Valathi Sastha Kovil Festival ====
In the month of Aadi (ஆடி), one time/2 year. Celebrated by Pillai Valathi Sastha Vagayaraakkal

- Main God:
1. Pillai Valatthi Saasthaa - பிள்ளை வளர்த்தி சாஸ்தா

==== Esakki Amman Kovil Festival ====
In the month of Thai (தை), yearly one time.

- Main God:
1. Esakki Amman - இசக்கி அம்மன்

==== Karguvel Ayyanar Kovil Festival ====
In the month of Vaigasi (வைகாசி), yearly one time. Celebrated by Karguvel Ayyanar Sastha Vagayaraakkal

- Main God:
1. Karkuvel Ayyanar - கற்குவேல் அய்யனார்

==== Vadakkuthi Amman Kovil Festival ====
This temple festival will be combined with Amman Kovil festival.

- Main God:
1. Amman - அம்மன்

=== Churches ===
- Christ Church - Church of South India.

=== Mosque ===
- None

== Profession ==
Agriculture plays a vital role in the village economy. Men work in agriculture and women are support to them. However most of women are beedi rollers. Beedi rolling is the second profession. 99.99% of the people having own land for agriculture. 0.01% people are coolies; they work in palm fiber factories. The palm fibers are exported to another place to be spin into rope.

== Tourist places ==
The nearest main tourist places are:

- Courtallam - 39.6 km distance from Kadanganeri. Courtallam is situated at the Western Ghats in Tenkasi Taluk. The famous waterfalls on rocks and tiny droplets are sprinkled in the air. The water falls of Courtalam have medicinal value as they run through forest and herbs before their descent.
- Papanasam, Tirunelveli - 44.1 km distance from Kadanganeri
- Agasthiyar Falls - 46.8 km distance from Kadanganeri. Agasthiar falls also attracts tourist and pilgrims
- Sorimuthu Ayyanar Temple - 55.6 km distance from Kadanganeri.
- Karaiyar Dam - 58.5 km distance from Kadanganeri.
- Kalakadu - 60.6 km distance from Kadanganeri. There is a Wild life sanctuary, Spotted deer, Liontailed monkeys, Elephants and Tigers are plenty.
- Mundanthurai Tiger Reserve - 56.1 km distance from Kadanganeri. There is a Wild life sanctuary, Spotted deer, Liontailed monkeys, Elephants and Tigers are plenty.
- Thenmala, Kerala - 70.0 km distance from Kadanganeri.

== Directions / Transports ==
=== Route guide ===
- Alangulam-Kadanganeri (13 km) Via: Alangulam, Tirunelveli-Kuruvankottai, Kurippankulam, Maruthappapuram, Nettur-Kadanganeri.
- Tirunelveli-Kadanganeri (41 km) Via: Tirunelveli-Azhakiyapandipuram, Vagaikkulam, Ukkirankottai, Reddiyarpatti (V.W.Puram)-Kadanganeri.
- Sankarankovil-Kadanganeri (41 km) Via: Sankarankovil-Utthumalai-Kadanganeri.

=== Bus / Transport ===
- Government Buses
1. 19 ^Alangulam <=> Azhagiyapandiyapuram
2. 21 ^Surandai <=> Reddiyarpatti (V.W.Puram)
3. 5c ^Alangulam <=> Azhagiyapandiyapuram
4. 261 ^Ambasamudram <=> Sankarankovil
5. 159 ^Ambasamudram <=> Sankarankovil
6. 43d ^Alangulam <=> Devarkulam
7. LSS ^Tirunelveli <=> Puliyankudi
8. SFS ^Tenkasi <=> Azhakiyapandipuram
- Private Buses (Indoors)
1. KR (KASI) ^Ambasamudram <=> Sankarankovil
2. SST (சீதாபதி) ^Ambasamudram <=> Azhagiyapandiyapuram
3. TPC Raja ^Tirunelveli <=> Surandai
- Private

The buses start from Alangulam.

1. Ashwin Travels ^Alangulam <=> Chennai
2. National Travels ^Alangulam <=> Chennai
3. Apple Travels ^Alangulam <=> Chennai

The buses are start from Reddiyarpatti (V.W.Puram) then you have to reach Reddiyarpatti bus stop to board the bus.

1. SBT Travels ^Reddiyarpatti (V.W.Puram) <=> Chennai
2. AVK Travels ^Reddiyarpatti (V.W.Puram) <=> Chennai

=== Railways ===
1. Tenkasi Junction
  1. Station Code - TSI
  2. Distance - 34.7 km
2. TIRUNELVELI Junction
  1. Station Code - TEN
  2. Distance - 37.6 km

=== Airports ===
1. Tuticorin Airport - 66 km
2. Trivandrum International Airport - 93 km
3. Madurai Airport - 133 km
