= Ariyanayagipuram (Sankarankovil) =

Ariyanayagipuram Flower City
- Village
- Location in Tamil Nadu, India Ariyanayagipuram (India)
- Coordinates: 9.10°N 77.42°E
- Country: India
- State: Tamil Nadu
- District: Tenkasi

Population (2011)
  - Total: 6,956

Languages
  - Official: Tamil
- Time zone: UTC+5:30 (IST)
- PIN: 627862
- Telephone code: 04636
- Vehicle registration: TN 79
- Sex ratio: 1032 ♂/♀
- Lok Sabha constituency: Tenkasi
- Vidhan Sabha constituency: Vasudevanallur
- Climate: Cool (Köppen)
- Website: under%20construction

Ariyanayagipuram is a Gram panchayat in Tirunelveli district (also known as Nellai district) located in Kadayanallur Taluk in the Indian state of Tamil Nadu. Native languages include, but are not limited to, the following: Tamil, Malayalam, Telugu, English and Hindi.

== Education ==
While there are several schools within the vicinity of Ariyanayagipuram, only one school is located directly within the city: H.N.U.C. Hr. Sec. School (Hindu Nadar Uravin Murai Committee Higher Secondary School). Approximately 8 villages study in Ariyanayagipuram's school. However, there are several engineering and arts colleges located in the surrounding areas.

Other schools near Ariyanayagipuram:

- Hindu Nadar Uravin Murai Committee HR Sec School
- Jamila Nursery School
- Govt School Thiruvattanallur
- Sandror School
- Santroe School
- Sardar Raja College of Engineering, Alangulam
- S.Veerasamy Chettiyar Group of Institutions, Puliyangudi
- Mano Arts & Science College, Puliangudi
- J.P Engineering College, Aigudi, Tenkasi
- MSPVL Polytechnic College, Pavoorchatram
- Einstein College of Engg, Seethaparbanallur, Alankulam
- Parasakthi Arts & Science College for Women, Courtallam, Tenkasi
- Govt.Arts & Science College, Surandai
- Laksmi ITI, Puliyangudi
- Sri Meenakshi B.Ed. College, Puliyangudi

== Geography ==
Ariyanayagipuram is located in the Tirunelveli district, the southernmost part of India. It encompasses the bottom tip of the country, and the coastline extends up the eastern side, 9.10 degrees N,77.42 degrees E.

== Railways ==
The railways within the area are majestic looking structures with a high elevated facade. Pambakovilsandy(PBKS) railway station is located in the northern side of Ariyanayagipuram. It is connected to major cities in all directions, namely Madurai/Virudhunagar to the north and Tenkasi/Kollam to the west.
