= Sathirakondan =

Sathirakondan (Sankarankovil)
- Panchayat village
- Location in Tamil Nadu, India Sathirakondan (Sankarankovil) (India)
- Coordinates: 9.168902°N 77.541387°E
- Country: India
- State: Tamil Nadu
- District: Tenkasi

Languages
  - Official: Tamil
- Time zone: UTC+5:30 (IST)
- PIN: 627754
- Vehicle registration: TN-79 SankarankovilRTO
- Largest city: Tirunelveli
- Nearest city: Sankarankovil; Tirunelveli

Sathirakondan is a village in Sankarankoil, Tenkasi district in the Indian state of Tamil Nadu. This village is under the control of Kuruvikulam block.
