= Pallakkal Pudukkudi =

Pallakkaal Pothukudi Pallakkal
- Village Panchayat
- Location in Tamil Nadu, India Pallakkaal Pothukudi (India)
- Coordinates: 8°44′44″N 77°27′35″E
- Country: India
- State: Tamil Nadu
- District: Tirunelveli

Languages
  - Official: Tamil
- Time zone: UTC+5:30 (IST)
- PIN: 627413
- Telephone code: 04634
- Lok Sabha constituency: Tirunelveli
- Vidhan Sabha constituency: Cheranmahadevi
- Website: pallakkalpothukudi.blogspot.com

Pallakkal Pothukudi is a village under Pappakudi panchayat union in Ambasamudram taluk of Tirunelveli district. Primary occupation of the people is Agriculture

== Geography ==
Pallakkal Pothukudi is located at 8.746026°N 77.459947°E. It is situated in Ambasamudram- Alangulam Road surrounded by Adaichani and Pananjadi. It has a Panchayat Union Primary School and Government higher secondary school.
