= Rani Mangammal Salai =

Roads constructed by Rani Mangammal

The roads which were constructed by Rani Mangammal (1689–1704) are called as Rani Mangammal Salai. The queen was a great administrator who is still widely remembered as a maker of roads and avenues, and a builder of temples, tanks and choultries with many of her public works still in use.

== List of roads ==
The following roads were constructed during her administration and remembered by her name.

From	To	Distance	Current District
Alangulam	Ambasamudram	20 km	Tirunelveli
