= Kaluneerkulam =

Village panchayat in Tirunelveli, Tamil Nadu, India

Kaluneerkulam (or Kalunikuram) is a village panchayat in the Tenkasi district of Tamil Nadu, India. It was in Tirunelveli district prior to the formation of Tenkasi district om 22 November 2019. It forms part of Keelapavoor block and Alangulam Assembly constituency.

== Geography ==
The latitude 8.908222 and longitude 77.449022 are the geo-coordinates of the Kaluneerkulam.

== Transport ==
The nearest railway station to Kaluneerkulam is Tenkasi Jn which is located in and around 16.0 kilometer distance.

Kaluneerkulam's nearest airport is Tuticorin Airport situated at 66.8 km distance.

== Education ==
Kaluneerkulam nearest schools has been listed as follows. மறவா நடுநிலை பள்ளி . Raja Middle School-0.1 km. Anna Boy S High School-3.3 km. T P S Govt Higher Secondary School-3.8 km. Rathna Middle School-5.1 km. Nadar Hindu High School-5.9 km.
