= Ventrilingapuram =

Ventrilingapuram Singaththikulam
- Village
- Nickname: Mini Japan
- Location in Tamil Nadu, India Ventrilingapuram (India)
- Coordinates: 9.092°N 77.4915°E
- Country: India
- State: Tamil Nadu
- District: Tirunelveli

Government

Population (2010)
  - Total: 2,080

Languages
  - Official: Tamil
- Time zone: UTC+5:30 (IST)
- PIN: 627862
- Sex ratio: 50:50 ♂/♀

Ventrilingapuram is a panchayat village Near sankarankovil at Tenkasi district [Before 2018, at Tirunelveli District ] in the Indian state of Tamil Nadu.

A fast-growing village, Ventrilingapuram is located between Sankarankoil and Surandai, which are surrounded by several villages. Ventrilingapuram has a lake which is second biggest area lake in Tenkasi district and 3 consecutive small hills.

== Location ==
Ventrilingapuram is the biggest village in the Pattadakatti panchyat of Sankarankoil taluk, Tirunelveli district, at the foot of the Western Ghats. Pattadakatti panchayat comprises Ventrilingapuram, Tharmathoorani, Sarkaraikulam, Thattankulam, Chandragiri village, Rail Pattadakatti, Pattadakatti and partial of Pudur Village. Pattadakatti Panchat is in Mela Neelitha Nallur block, Sankarankoil Taluk.

== Description ==
Ventrilingapuram has a large Lions pond at the foot of Great Mountain. It has a population of 2,080.

The people of the village harvest crops and manufacture beedis.

The village has more than a dozen temples. Cultural events such as Villu Paatu, Kumbam Dance, and Medai Nadagam take place during the Celebration of Temples. The Familiar Temple of this village was named as Vennivudayar and Marriamman Kaliamman Temple. The village got its name because of the temple of Vennivudayar, which means "Shiva".

== Transportation ==
Ventrilingapuram has one bus stands to the needs of populations. The old bus stand serves as buses every 30 minutes from Sankarankoil to Veerasigamani via Ventrilingapuram and every 60 minutes from Sankarankoil to Surandai via Ventrilingapuram.
