= Muthukrishnaperi =

- Village
- Location in Tamil Nadu, India Muthukrishnaperi (India)
- Coordinates: 8.8948°N 77.44889°E
- Country: India
- State: Tamil Nadu
- District: Tirunelveli

Languages
  - Official: Tamil
- Time zone: UTC+5:30 (IST)
- PIN: 627861
- Telephone code: 04633 - xxxxxx
- Nearest city: Alangulam
- Literacy: 21%

Muthukrishnaperi is a village in the Tenkasi district of Tamil Nadu, India. State highway 39B passes through the village, continuing north to the town of Surandai and south to join state highway 39 between Alangulam and Pavoorchatram.

== History ==
On 12 June 1899 it was Muthukrishnaperi's turn to witness a serious disturbance, after several villages in the area had been the subject of dacoities and rioting. A local Village Magistrate was later charged with instigating the action against Muthukrishnaperi's Shanar residents, whose homes were set on fire and looted. About 300 persons were involved. Muthukrishnaperi along with other local villages in Tenkasi Taluk was made the subject of a temporary police presence until the disturbances were quelled. The Village Magistrate was sentenced to six years' "rigorous imprisonment".

== Facilities ==
Hindu High School, Muthukrishnaperi was founded as a primary school in 1940, upgraded to a Middle School in 1987 and acquired its current status in 2012. The village has one government aided child care center and one High school named Hindu Middle school providing education from 1st to 10th standard.
