= M. L. Thangappa =

Indian (Tamil) writer and translator (1934-2018)

M. L. Thangappa (March 8, 1934 – May 31, 2018) was a Tamil writer and translator. He wrote many poems, articles and translations.

== Biography ==
=== Early life ===
Thangappa was born on March 8, 1934, in Kurumbalaperi which is in the Tirunelveli district of Tamil Nadu. He studied in St.John's college, Tirunelveli. He moved to Puducherry in 1959 to teach English and then taught in various schools until 1967. He pursued a postgraduate degree in Tamil literature and won the Sahitya Akademi Prize in 2012 for his translation of Tamil Sangam poetry.

=== Literary works ===
His translations ranged from Tamil bhakti poetry, iconoclastic Siddhar poetry, and Kalingathu Parani, to the nineteenth century Vallalar Ramalinga Swamigal, and the twentieth century greats, Subramania Bharathi and Bharathidasan. He also finished a translation of the Tamil didactic text, Naladiyar.

Over the course of his career, he wrote more than 50 books, as well as translating the poems of Bharathi, Aravindar and Bharathidasan into English. His translations from the Tamil classics have appeared in Penguin Books as Love Stands Alone: Sections from Tamil Sangam Poetry. He died on May 31, 2018, with his body being donated to the Jawaharlal Institute of Postgraduate Medical Education and Research.

== Honours and awards ==
M L Thangappa has the rare credit of winning the Sahitya Akademi awards for both children's literature and translation. He was awarded the Bala Puraskar in 2010 (awarded in 2011) for his book titled Chola Kollai Bommai, a collection of poems and nursery rhymes for children. In 2012, Thangappa won the Sahitya Akademi Translation Prize for his translation Love Stands Alone: Selections from Tamil Sangams Poetry.

== Works ==
=== Translations ===
- Hues and Harmonies from an Ancient Land
- Love Stands Alone: Selections from Tamil Sangam Poetry
- Red Lilies and Frightened Birds : Muthollayiram
- Vallalar Ramalinga Swamigal’s Songs of Grace
- The Prince Who Became a Monk and Other Stories from Tamil Literature

=== Tamil ===
- Chola Kollai Bommai
