= Keelapavoor block =

Keelapavoor block is a revenue block in the Tenkasi district of Tamil Nadu, India. It has a total of 21 panchayat villages.

== See also ==
- Muthukrishnaperi
