= Pavanasapuram =

pavanasapuram
- village
- Location in Tamil Nadu, India pavanasapuram (India)
- Coordinates: 9.00687°N 77.449°E
- Country: India
- State: Tamil Nadu
- District: Tirunelveli
- Elevation: 132 m (433 ft)

Population (2001)
  - Total: 2,184

Languages
  - Official: Tamil
- Time zone: UTC+5:30 (IST)
- PIN: 627859
- Telephone code: 04633
- Vehicle registration: TN76

Pavanasapuram is a small village in Tirunelveli district, South India. It is very near to Anaikulam.
