= Thulukkarpatti =

Village in Tamil Nadu, India

- Village
- Location in Tamil Nadu, India Thulukkarpatti (India)
- Coordinates: 8.42808°N 77.67104°E
- Country: India
- State: Tamil Nadu
- District: Tirunelveli

Language(s)
  - Official: Tamil
- Time zone: UTC+5:30 (IST)
- Postal code: 627101

Thulukkarpatti is a village in the state of Tamil Nadu, India. It is located in Tirunelveli district. Thulukkarpatti is situated on the Nambiyar river. It falls under Radhapuram taluk, and the pincode is 627101.

== Archaeological finds ==
Thulukkarpatti has received attention in recent years due to archaeological finds that have shed light on ancient Tamil civilization. The Tamil Nadu government has set aside significant amount of funds for excavations in the state, including in Thulukkarpatti, to help underline the antiquity, culture and values of Tamil society.

The antiquities unearthed from Thulukkarpatti include potsherds with Tamil inscription, copper rings, iron objects, terracotta gamesmen, spindle whorl and glass beads.
