= Sri Renga Narayana Puram =

S.R.N. Puram
- Village
- Location in Tamil Nadu
- Coordinates: 8.167°N 77.643°E
- Country: India
- State: Tamil Nadu
- District: Tirunelveli
- Taluk: Radhapuram

Population (2012)
  - Total: 2,500
- Time zone: UTC+05:30 (IST)
- ISO 3166 code: IN-TN
- Literacy: 90 per cent(Approx.)
- Official language: Tamil

Sri Renga Narayana Puram, also called S.R.N. Puram, is a village in Radhapuram Taluk of Tirunelveli district, Tamil Nadu, India. It is located in the southern tip of Tirunelveli district, 18 km from Kanyakumari and 80 km from Tirunelveli city. This village has an excellent natural atmosphere mixed with the breeze of everlasting wind and the Indian Ocean. This surplus wind makes this place ideal for wind power generation.

== About ==
This village comes under the administration of Chettikulam Panchayat. It has a population of about 1,500 people. With its strong agricultural tradition, it has performed reasonably well in terms of literacy growth. This place connects Kanyakumari and Tuticorin, via State Highway 176 (SH 176). The villas here are portraying the elegance of fine living.

== Living ==
This village is surrounded all around by agricultural fields. Moreover, it has 'Hanuman River' which connects with Indian Ocean. SRN primary & nursery school is having about 100 students. The nearest higher secondary school is in Chettikulam (Government Higher secondary school), 4 km from here. There are a good number of Arts and Engineering colleges in and around.

== Festival ==
People of S.R.N. Puram celebrates festivals like Pongal (Every year this festival will be organized by SMSC TEAM MEMBERS), Ganesh Chaturthi (organized by RADAN GUYS), Diwali with Songs through loud speakers that reaches nook and corner of the village (a sign of festive). Also on this occasions cultural programs organised by volunteers with people taking different roles for the goodness and unity among public. The temple festivals to the goddess Muththara Amman, Moorthi swamy Sudalai madan, Ayyan Temple, Esakki Amman, pillaiyar are also a grand event for the people. Each and every function will be organised in home unlike in cities, which is most delightful with the relatives and others presence making it a remembering event.

== Locality ==
The Kudankulam Nuclear Power Project built a large Township also known as Anu Vijay Township for its employees near the village. Kanyakumari (18 km or 11 mi), Nagerkoil (25 km or 16 mi), Tirunelvelli (75 km or 47 mi), Tiruchendur (71 km or 44 mi), Tuticorin (111 km or 69 mi), Rameshwaram (315 km or 196 mi), Trivandrum (100 km or 62 mi).

== Food ==
South Indian cuisine, where rice and rice-derived dishes form the major portion of a diet. Rice is the staple food of this village and is typically mixed with sambhar (with or without ghee), vegetarian or non-vegetarian kulambu, rasam, curd and buttermilk. This is accompanied with various vegetarian and/or non-vegetarian dishes like kootu, aviyal, poriyal, appalam, varuval, varieties of pickles and chicken, mutton. Breakfast and snack items include dosai, idly, appam (aappam), puttu, uppumavu (uppuma), idiyappam. These items are eaten along with sambar, varieties of chatni. The availability of fresh fish (மீன் குழம்பு) is another remarkable food item among the people.
