= Kalathimadam =

- Village
- Nickname: KLM
- Location in Tamil Nadu, India Kalathimadam (India)
- Coordinates: 8.84°N 77.48°E
- Country: India
- State: Tamil Nadu
- District: Tenkasi
- Elevation: 127 m (417 ft)

Languages
  - Official: Tamil
- Time zone: UTC+5:30 (IST)
- PIN: 627851
- Telephone code: 04633
- Sex ratio: 1000 :1040.8 ♂/♀
- Literacy: 69%
- Lok Sabha constituency: Tirunelveli
- Vidhan Sabha constituency: Alangulam
- Website: www.alangulam.in/kmadam.htm

Kalathimadam is a village near Alangulam in Tenkasi district of Tamil Nadu, India.The Village derives its name from the Kalathivinayagar Temple which is located in the Village.The Village is located at a distance of about 1.7 km from the Alangulam. The village is well connected to alangulam through Mini bus service.

== Employment ==
This village has a number of people involved in agriculture, however now agriculture in this area is decreasing. This place is noted for the self-employed beedi workers. Most of the women are involved in beedi making. No major factory is available around this village. Daily wages is one of the main income for people. Totally 50 tractors workings for form. In this area well building work is famous. 20 well making machine here. Many people from this village are working in Indian Army/Air Force/Navy, BSF, CRPF as well as Tamil Nadu Police in various ranks.

== Utilities and facilities ==
More than 25 Palasarakku shops.

10 Tea shops

Arunachala Nadar & Sons Traders

KR lodge

Amman Borewell

More than 5 Two wheeler workshops

M S Hollow blocks

SubramaniyaBharathi rice store

NVS Beedi shop

== Temples ==
- Kalathi Vinayagar Alayam
- Amman Kovil
- Thalavai Sudalaimadan Thirukovil
- Nochiyadi Sudalai Madan Kovil
- THUSIMADASAMY KOVIL
- Ayya Vaikundasamy Koil
- Church of South India Church
- faith church of god (CHURCH)

== No of Teams ==
Black Rose Friends

Friends Cricket Club

Mass Royal Friends

Nadar Cricket Club

Love Star Group
