= Mangudi (Tirunelveli District) =

- Village
- Location within Tamil Nadu Location within India
- Coordinates: 9.354519°N 77.522922°E
- Country: India
- State: Tamil Nadu
- District: Tenkasi

Population (2009)
  - Total: 1,876

Languages
  - Official: Tamil
- Time zone: UTC+5:30 (IST)
- PIN: 626111

Mangudi is a village in Sankarankoil Taluk, Tenkasi District in the state of Tamil Nadu, India.

== Geography ==
Mangudi is located at 9.35°N 77.52°E. The nearest towns are Rajapalaiyam, Srivilliputtur and Sankarankovil.

== History ==
Mangudi is an ancient village. The author of Maduraikanchi i.e. Mangudi Marudhanar came from Mangudi. Surface explorations by the Department of Archaeology have found black and red ware pieces containing Tamil Brahmi inscriptions (dated 2nd century BC)

== Demographics ==
As on 2009, Mangudi has a population of 1876.

== Festivals ==
- Panguni festival (3 days)
- Aadi festival (3 days)
- Thamizhar Thirunal Pongal vizha
- Manju virattu
- KABBADI TOURNAMENT

== Schools in Mangudi ==
- TDTA Middle School
- P.K.Hr.Sec.School
- R.C.High School

== Tailoring center in Mangudi ==
- All are doing in job works in tailoring industries, Annai Theresa Mahalir SHG Tailoring Training Center, Kavitha Nighty, Nithila Nighty, Thangamanatheri-Malakani.T Empriding
