= Sembikulam =

- Country: India
- District: Tirunelveli
- State: Tamil Nadu

Population
  - Total: around 7,000

Sembikulam is a small village in Tirunelveli district, Tamil Nadu state in southern India.

It has one primary school, TDTA Primary School, but no secondary education facilities. Students travel to Vadakkankulam or Avaraikulam for secondary schooling.

The majority of the population is muslims&Hindu . The population also includes Christians.

Having a 109 years old mosque and 55 years old Hindu temple which states the unity of the village people.

Most of the people yields their economic wealth from Saudi Arabia since 1985.

The village produces flower and beedi for export.

Neighbouring villages include Madhaga Neri, Alaganeri, Avaraikulam, and Vadakkankulam.
