= Vellakulam =

Coordinates: 12°48′N 79°37′E

- village
- Interactive map of Vellakulam
- Country: India
- State: Tamil Nadu
- District: Tenkasi

Government
  - Type: Panchayati raj (India)
  - Body: Gram panchayat

Languages
  - Official: Tamil
- Time zone: UTC+5:30 (IST)
- PIN: 627719
- Telephone code: 04636
- Vehicle registration: TN-79

Vellakulam is a village located in the Tenkasi District (Earlier with Tirunelveli District till Year 2019) of South Tamil Nadu, India. The village is located 20–25 km from Kovilpatti and Sankarankovil.

This village is primarily dependent on agriculture, farmers are the core of the village. It is part of Panchayat, and its jurisdiction includes the following villages:

1. Vellakulam
2. Kasilingapuram
3. North Aivaypulipatti
4. South Aivaypalipatti
