= Subramaniapuram, Tirunelveli =

Subramaniapuram is a village in Tenkasi taluk, Tirunelveli district, Tamil Nadu state, India and comes under Kuthukkal Valasai Panchayat. This is an old village which has been named after Subramaniya Karayallar who gave his own land to the people in early days. This is the last village in Tenkasi West and it is 1.5 km away from Shenkottai. Now this village populated as 1230*, i.e.; 48% of male and 52% of female. Illiteracy of 35% . This village is formed in the 20th century. People are working together for their agricultural land. Paddy, sugarcane, groundnuts, corn, coconut and Black dal are cultivated here.

== Schools and educational institutions ==
- Govt. primary school
- New model English school

== Religious places ==
A.G Church - This is the second A.G (Assemblies of God) church founded in India by the Mother Edwards in 1950s.
