= Anaikulam =

Coordinates: 8.3990746°N 77.6689736°E

- Village
- Interactive map of Anaikulam
- Country: India
- State: Tamil Nadu
- District: Tirunelveli district
- Taluk: Radhapuram taluk
- PIN Code: 627117

Anaikulam village is located in Radhapuram Taluka of Tirunelveli district of South Indian state of Tamil Nadu. It is situated 20 km away from Radhapuram and 60 km away from district headquarter Tirunelveli. It is located less than 10 km away from Valliyur.

Anaikulam is also a Gram Panchayat.

Nearby villages of Anaikulam are Vaithiyalingapuram, Thangayam, Kizhavaneri, Thulukkarpatti, Cithoor Mylaputhur, Madapuram, Kallikulam, Kannanallur, Kovankulam, Dalapathi samudram, Pudhur.
