= Oormelalagiyan =

- village
- Location in Tamil Nadu, India Oormelalagiyan (India)
- Coordinates: 9°1′19.25″N 77°21′31.7″E
- Country: India
- State: Tamil Nadu
- District: Tirunelveli

Languages
  - Official: Tamil
- Time zone: UTC+5:30 (IST)
- Nearest city: Tirunelveli

Oormelalagiyan (also transliterated as Oormenialagiyan, Urmenialagiyan, Urmelalagiyan, and Oormelalagian) is a village in Tamil Nadu, India. It is located about 13 kilometres (8.1 mi) from Tenkasi and 15 kilometres (9.3 mi) Courtallam. It is geographically well positioned with a "Lord Ganesh" temple in the entrance of the village and housing scenic views of Western Ghats and drizzling winds from there.

The village is also known for their peoples’ artistic talents for several decades. Their reach is beyond the boundaries of village and contributions have been appreciated even in present-day stylish Tamil film industry. At least 15 known cinematographers were from this village.

It won the president award (2009) for its hygiene.
