= Thachanallur Pastorate =

- Good Shepherd Church, Thachanallur Pastorate
- Country: India
- Website: www.csithachanallur.org

History
- Founded: 19 February 1993
- Dedication: Rt. Rev. S Jeyapaul David
- Dedicated: 19 February 1993

Administration
- District: Tirunelveli
- Province: Tamil Nadu
- Diocese: Tirunelveli Diocese
- Parish: Thachanallur Pastorate

Clergy
- Bishop: Rt. Rev. J.J. Christdoss
- Pastor(s): Asirvadham Moses, Mr. Prabakaran, Mr. Jebastin, Sam Sargunaraj

Thachanallur Pastorate is a pastorate which belongs to the Tirunelveli Diocese in Tamil Nadu, India. Thachanallur Pastorate was previously affiliated with the Tirunelveli Junction Pastorate. It was separated in 2009 and emerged as a new pastorate.

== History ==
The Christian people who lived in the small town "Thachanallur" started gathering in the TDTA primary school, which belonged to the Tirunelveli Junction Pastorate. The church was named "The Christ Church" by Rev. Clement Duraisingh. The first Catechist of this was Mr. P. Koilpillai.

Praying members of the congregation had a vision of building a new church for themselves. The land for the church was brought near the southern bypass road; however, the members of the church were not rich enough to support the construction of the church building. At that time Thangadurai Dhanaraj took charge of catechist. Finally the church was built and opened for worship on 18 February 1996. Rev. Clement Duraisingh renamed it as "Good Shepherd Church". In 2006 Mr. Andrew became the catechist of the congregation.

CSI - Thachanallur Pastorate

== Pastorate ==
Tirunelveli Junction Pastorate was divided into two. Good Shepherd Church was given the autonomy. Along with four more congregations Thachanallur Pastorate was established on 4 April 2009. The pastorate is affiliated to the North-West Council of the Tirunelveli Diocese. Rev. P. Swaminathan was appointed as the first Presbyter-in-charge for the newly formed Thachanallur Pastorate. Rev. M. Rajasekaran served as the Presbyter-in-charge for the Pastorate. Rev. A. Paul Jebaraj is the current Pastorate Chairman & Correspondent of Thachanallur Pastorate.
