= Kurumbapapperi =

- Village
- Country: India
- State: Tamil Nadu
- District: Tirunelveli

Languages
  - Official: Tamil
- Time zone: UTC+5:30 (IST)

Kurumbalapperi is a village in Tirunelveli district, Tamil Nadu, India. It is located between the cities of Tenkasi and Tirunelveli. The village was named for the groves of kurumbala (a sumal jackfruit) trees in the area. The vast majority of the inhabitants work in agriculture. One noteworthy feature is a large temple called Pathirakali Amman Koil that was constructed in the village.
