= Kulakkattakurichi =

- Village
- Location in Tamil Nadu, India Kulakkattakurichi (India)
- Coordinates: 9.21°N 77.72°E
- Country: India
- State: Tamil Nadu
- District: Tirunelveli

Languages
  - Official: Tamil
- Time zone: UTC+5:30 (IST)

Kulakkattakurichi is a panchayat Village in Tirunelveli district in the Indian state of Tamil Nadu. This village is under the control of Kuruvikulam block Sankarankoil taluk
