= Mathaganeri =

- Location within Tamil Nadu
- Coordinates: 8.2209887°N 77.6108766°E

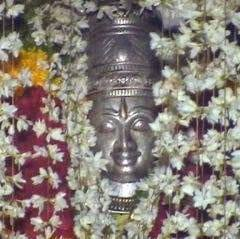
Sriman Narayana Swamy

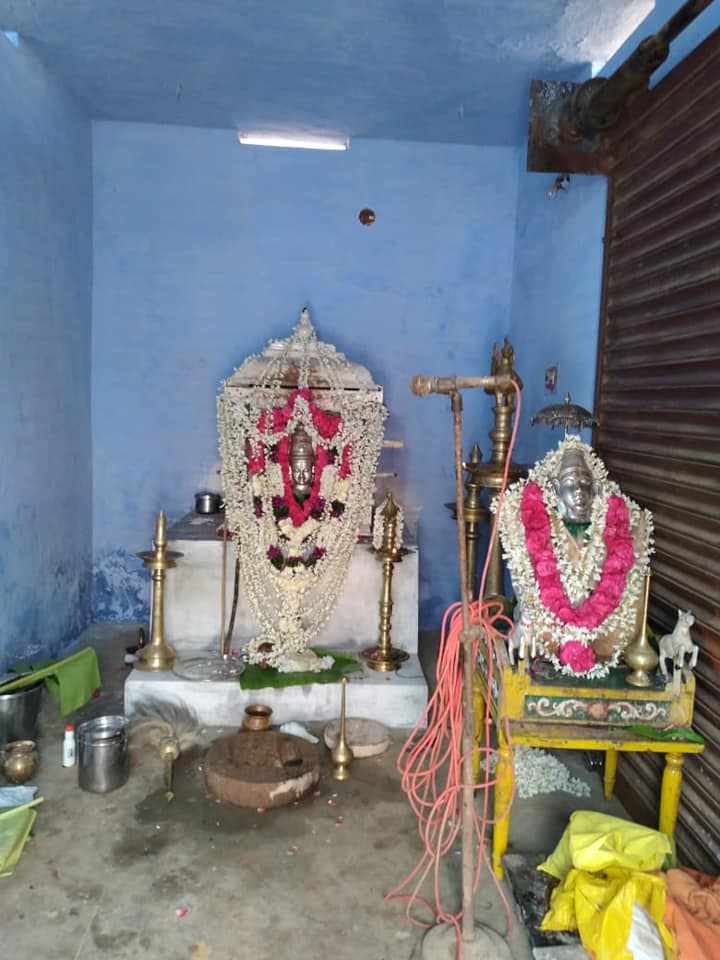

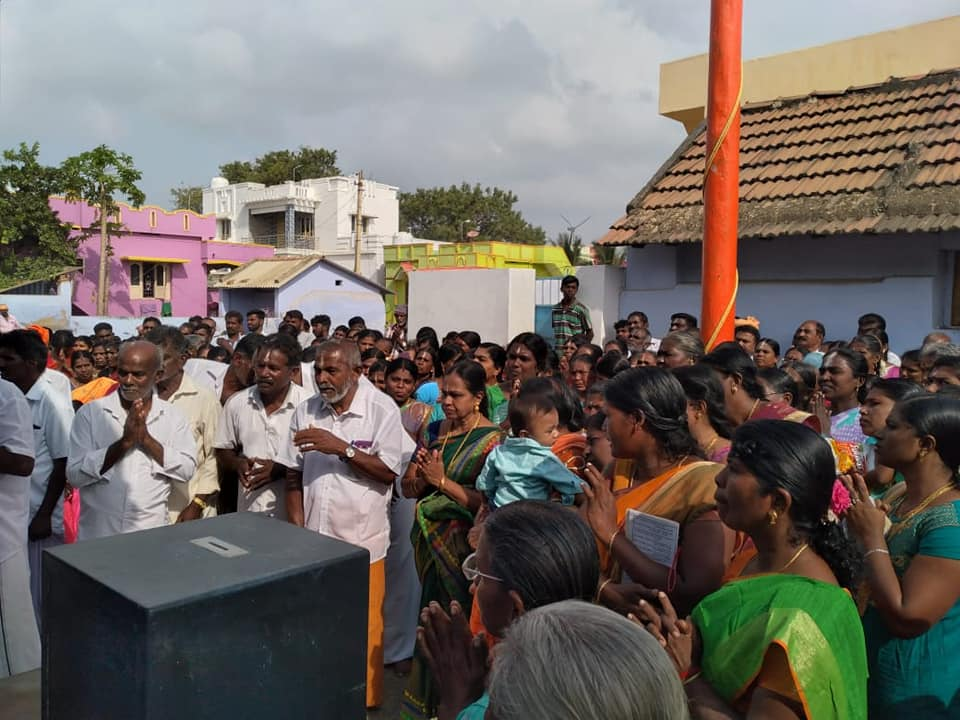

Mathaganeri is a village in Tirunelveli District, the state of Tamil Nadu, India. It is also called Mathaganelloor.

Mathagai Mutharamman temple, Sriman Narayana Swamy temple, Therkathiyan temple, Manthkarai Sudalaimada Swamy temple, Manna Raja temple, Isakkiyamman temple, and many more temples can be found in Mathaganeri. Additional to these temples the village has two more temples, Amman Kovil and Guru Swamy Kovil. Sriman Narayana Swamy Temple is going to be rebuilt by the Madhaganeri people and the ceremony of erecting a base of the temple held on 23 April 2019.

The Madhaganeri people is all set to inaugurate new construction of Sriman Narayana Swami Temple on 5 February in the presence of honourable Kumari.
