= Kandithankulam =

Coordinates: 8.633871°N 77.680097°E

Kandithankulam is a village near Ponnagudi in Tirunelveli district, Tamil Nadu, India. There are more than 100 houses in the village. All the residents of the village are Christian Nadars. There are two Protestant churches in the village, one of which was built in 1914. The village also has a primary school. This village has had an unusually high number of people who have migrated, especially to Mumbai and Delhi.
