= Mela Thiruvenkatanathapuram =

Mela Thiruvenkatanathapuram Thirunankovil
- village
- Location in Tamil Nadu, India Mela Thiruvenkatanathapuram (India)
- Coordinates: 8°41′25″N 77°40′0″E
- Country: India
- State: Tamil Nadu
- District: Tirunelveli

Languages
  - Official: Tamil
- Time zone: UTC+5:30 (IST)
- Nearest city: Tirunelveli

Mela Thiruvenkatanathapuram also known as Thirunankovil is a hamlet situated on the bank of river Thamirabarani. It is about 10 km from Tirunelveli, a district headquarters in Tamil Nadu, South India. There are 3 different routes from Tirunelveli to reach this place. The village is located on a hillock and the temple is located at an elevated plane surface. Even though these roads are narrow, they are navigable and every day mini bus service (Route No. 6A and 6B from Tirunelveli) is in operation which goes up to the temple entrance.
