= Singampathu =

Singampathu is a small Indian village located at latitude 8.52°N 77.558°E It is just less than 1 kilometre (0.62 mi) away from the main town of Kalakkad. This village has historical significance, because people from this village fought against caste issues that are prevalent in this area. Prior to 1900s, only students from the upper cast are allowed to enter schools. Because of this partial treatment, people from this village joined and founded K.A.M.P Meerania School for the downtrodden and lower caste people.
