= Ittamozhi =

- Village
- Location within Tamil Nadu Location within India
- Coordinates: 8°23′36.15″N 77°50′45.69″E
- Country: India
- State: Tamil Nadu
- District: Tirunelveli
- Taluk: Nanguneri

Languages
  - Official: Tamil
- Time zone: UTC+5:30 (IST)
- PIN: 627652
- Telephone code: 91-(0)4637

Ittamozhi, is a small village in Nanguneri taluk, Tirunelveli district in Tamil Nadu state, India.

== People ==
More than 500 families are living in Ittamozhi village. Most of the peoples have moved there and settled from other parts of Tamil Nadu, including Coimbatore and Chennai. Many are involved in retail business. People of several castes reside in this village.

== Religion ==
Hindus and Christians both celebrate their religious festivals in Ittamozhi. There are many temples in Ittamozhi village, including Vadaku Mutharaman Kovail, South Mutharaman kovail, and Esakiamman Kovil.

Hindus celebrate a seven-day festival called Kovil Kodai in mid August every year (AAvani Maathan in the Tamil calendar), and people from out of village also come and celebrate this festival.

A well-known CSI St. Joseph Church is located on the Sathankulam to Valliur main road and Christian people celebrate Christmas and Easter in Ittamozhi.

Ittamozhi(இட்டமொழி):Once up on a time, UK people visited this place. They asked local people about the name of the place. Then as there was no name, they told whatever you told is this place name in Tamil as "neengal itta mozhi", then he pronounced as "ittamozhi", after that this place is called Ittamozhi. This means, Itta means whatever you say or told, Mozhi means name or language. Hence it is still Ittamozhi.

== Education ==
A V Joseph Govt Higher Secondary School is attended by young people in Ittamozhi and the surrounding villages. A few other private schools are also in the village.

== Environment ==
Ittamozhi has a dry climate, and a number of tamarind trees, palm trees and Acacia Nilotica trees can be seen. Since the village is near the Coast, the climate is hotter in summer. There are ponds (Ayyan kulam, urani kulam velankadu kulam) surrounding Ittamozhi which have water in entire year.

Ittamozhi was in the news when one of its residents, A. Nelson, began a cycling tour to raise awareness of HIV/AIDS, and again when a group from the village presented a petition to the local Collector.

== Facilities ==
- Govt primary healthcare
- Govt library
- BSNL Ex-change
- Post office
- EB Office
- Pandian bank
- Primary Agriculture Cooperative Bank
