= Singikulam =

- village
- Country: India
- State: Tamil Nadu
- District: Tirunelveli district
- Time zone: UTC+5:30 (IST)

Singikulam is a village in Tirunelveli District, Tamil Nadu, India. It is within the Kalakadu panchayat union.

== Geography ==
There exists a rocky outcrop in Singikulam referred to as the ‘Singikulam Pottai’. It is formed of granite gneiss. In the west it stretches across the Pachiyar and joins with the Kolunduma Malai.

Singikulam is 31 miles from Overi.

== Demographics ==
Per the 2011 Census of India, the population for Singikulam (New) was 1,671 of those male 825 and 846 female.

Per the 2011 Census of India, the population for Singikulam (Old) was 533, of those male 246 and 287 female.
