= Odaimarichan =

- village
- Odaimarichan panchayat
- Nickname: ODMN
- Interactive map of Odaimarichan
- Coordinates: 8°47′42″N 77°31′19″E
- Country: India
- State: Tamil Nadu
- Established: Before 1900 - present

Government
  - Type: Panchayat raj

Population
  - Total: 2,000

Languages
  - Official: Tamil
- Time zone: UTC+5:30 (IST)
- PIN: 627602
- Vehicle registration: TN 76

Odaimarichan Tirunelveli district of Tamil Nadu State in South India.
