= Kizhanatham =

Kizhanatham Melur Kizhanatham
- village
- Country: India
- State: Tamil Nadu
- District: Tirunelvelli

Languages
  - Official: Tamil
- Time zone: UTC+5:30 (IST)
- Nearest city: Tirunelvelli

Kizhanatham is a village near Palayamkottai in Tirunelveli district of Tamil Nadu India.

The Pincode of Kizhanatham is 627353.

It consist of two parts Vellakovil and kizhanatham. Kizhanatham as it now stands has a very old temple dedicated to Sri Venugopalaswamy with his consorts Rukmini and Satyabhama. Unlike other Venugopalaswamy shrines, the presiding deity has his head tilted backwards, in a fully absorbed mode of flute rendition which is not seen elsewhere.

There are many famous personalities from this small hamlet, notable among them are industrialist Sri N Krishnan ("Yenkay"), Rao Bahadur Kizhanatham Anantanarayanan Krishna Aiyangar (Rao Bahadur K A Krishna Aiyangar) of Alleppey who was a very famous lawyer of the early 1900s. Alleppey Krishna Aiyangar is the founder of the famous Sanathana Dharma Vidyala (SDV) Schools (1906).
