= Kurumbalapperi =

- village
- Country: India
- State: Tamil Nadu
- District: Tenkasi

Languages
  - Official: Tamil
- Time zone: UTC+5:30 (IST)
- Vehicle registration: TN-

Kurumbalapperi is a village in Tenkasi district, Tamil Nadu.

It is on the way from Tenkasi to Tirunelveli. Years ago there was a lot of kurumbala (a small jackfruit) trees, so the village got the name Kurumbalapperi. Most of the people work in agriculture. There is a big temple which is called Pathirakali Amman Koil.
