= Kalikumarapuram =

Coordinates: 8°16′N 77°51′E

Kalikumarapuram is a village situated on Tiruchendur on the Kanyakumari East Coast Road in the taluk of Thisayanvilai, Tirunelveli district, Tamil Nadu. Around 450 people live there.
