= Ambalam =

- village
- Location in Tamil Nadu, India Ambalam (India)
- Coordinates: 8°31′32″N 77°43′34″E
- Country: India
- State: Tamil Nadu
- District: Tirunelveli

Languages
  - Official: Tamil
- Time zone: UTC+5:30 (IST)
- PIN: 627354
- Telephone code: 04635
- Vehicle registration: TN-
- Nearest city: Tirunelveli
- Lok Sabha constituency: Tirunelveli

Ambalam is a small village in Nanguneri taluk, Tirunelveli District, Tamil Nadu, India.

Ambalam has two parts: South Ambalam and North Ambalam. The North Ambalam people's religion is Christianity and their caste is Nadar. More than 100 families live in North Ambalam. It has one middle school (CMS Evangelical Middle School), with around 100 students.

Ambalam [അമ്പലം] in Malayalam means a temple, as in Valanjambalam or Ambalappuzha.
