= Chembadu =

Hamlet in Tamil Nadu, India

Chembadu is a hamlet in Radhapuram Taluk, Thirunelveli District, Tamil Nadu, southern India.

Chembadu is soaked in red soil and scattered with palm trees. The little pond (Paadu) at the eastern side of the village is popular among the neighbouring villagers as it sustains summer and supplies water for the cattle population. It is from this pond the village got its name Chembadu, "chem" meaning red as in the soil, "paadu" meaning pond.

Most Chembadu residents are farmers, though some have entered the service sector as lawyers, engineers, teachers, and police officers. Women often work as beedi rollers. Chembadu has been a longstanding source of palm products like palm leaf and palm wood, and was well known for export-quality palm candy.

Most villagers are Hindu; a few are Roman Catholic. Though the Christians are the minority, they are the original inhabitants of this village and hold a majority of the land in and around the village. Our Lady of Lourdes and Ayya Vaikundar are the patron saints of Chembadu.
