= Thambithoppu =

Thambithoppu is a small village located in the town of Kalakkad, Tamil Nadu, India.

== Nearest villages ==
Thambithoppu is surrounded by many small villages like Manjuvilai, Pottarkulam, Karuvelankulam, Singampathu, etc.,

== Agriculture ==
Agriculture is the main occupation of the people living in Thambithoppu. Much agricultural land surrounds the village, planted in the region mostly to banana plantations. And as a cyclic crop, Rice is also grown.

== Religion ==
Although most inhabitants are Hindu, some people follow the Christian belief. Hindus worship Shriman Ayya Narayanaswamy as their deity, who is known to have lived from 1810 to 1851 in Swamithoppu, Kanyakumari District.

Shriman Ayya Narayana Swami Temple and Sudalamadasamy temple are located in Thambithoppu. Here, annually, "Thiruvizha" and "Kodai Vizha" functions are conducted which brings a lot of people from various locations to convene in Thambithoppu.

== Transportation ==
Thambithoppu can be reached from Tirunelveli, Nanguneri and Vallioor etc. by bus. The nearest railway station is Nanguneri. Nearest airports are at Thiruvananthapuram and Madurai. Tuticorin also has an airstrip having one flight a day and is about 80 km away.
