= Mylappapuram =

Mylappapuram Mylappuram
- village
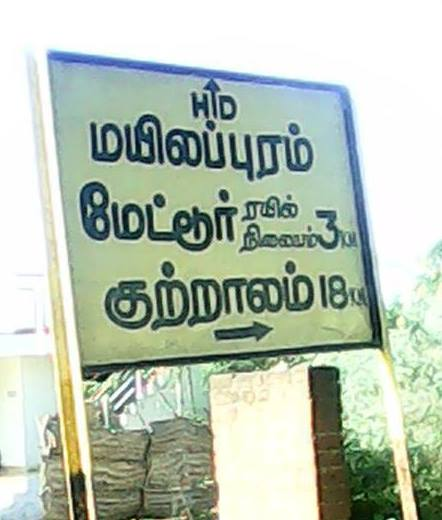
- Nickname: Mylai
- Location in Tamil Nadu, India Mylappapuram (India)
- Coordinates: 8°51′8″N 77°23′40″E
- Country: India
- State: Tamil Nadu
- District: Tirunelveli
  - Rank: village

Languages
  - Official: Tamil
- Time zone: UTC+5:30 (IST)
- Postal code: 627415
- Vehicle registration: Tenkasi (TN 76)

Mylappapuram is a small village located in Tirunelveli district. Mylappapuram has many temples and churches. Temple festivals are grantly celebrated every year. The Tamilnad Mercantile Bank Limited Vengadampatti Branch is located here. A church, which has been renovated and is nearly 100 years old, is located in Mylappapuram. A tasmac bar is also located here. It has a bus stand named kamarajar bus stand. Large water tanks supply thamirabarani water all over the village.

Mylappapuram is 17 km (11 mi) from Kutralam, 25 km (16 mi) from Papanasam and 7 km (4 mi) from Pavoorchatram. Mylappapuram, a small village is surrounded by many natural resources and waterfalls like Kutralam falls, Papanasam dam, Ramanathi dam, Kadananathi dam. Thamirabarani is the biggest and perennial river and it support 2 districts. But it is unable to supply water to Mylappapuram, and it is 30 km (19 mi) from the Pothigai mountain.

== Mylappapuram ==
- Mylappapuram
- South Mylappapuram
- Rajakkalkudiyirupu
- Arunthathiyar colony (East Street)
- Kamaraj Nagar

== Places of Mylappapuram ==
- Subramaniya swami Temple
- Roman Catholic church - Assi church
- Mylappapuram Tuesday Market
- Avvaiyar amman temple
- Mupputathi amman temple
- St. Andrew's church [Church of South India]
- south mylappuram amman Temple
- south mylappuram ramar Temple
- south mylappuram kalaswami Temple
- South mylappuram sudalai madaswami temble
- St. Thomas Church { Church Of South India}
- Naddu st amman kovil mylappapuram
- Poi kaatha Sudali Mada Swamy
- Thirumal Iyyan Temple

== Sports teams ==
- Mylai Sports Club
- ANV stars mylai ( cricket Team)
- chain Gang Group, Mylai. [cricket Team]
- Mylai cool guys
- New 11 stars
- shadow boys in south mylai
- Rajakudiyiruppu royal challengers (Rrc cricket)
- 7 Nanbargal [Kabadi Team]
- Action Boys
- Fire Friends [Cricket Team]
- Star kings group, Rajakudiyiruppu{cricket team}

== Festivals ==
- Vaikasi visagam,
- Pankuni Uthiram
- Pongal
- thirukarthigai deepam,
