= Kalangathakandy =

Kalangathakandy is a small village in Tirunelveli District in Tamil Nadu, located nearest to Shenkottai.

== Geography ==
The village is 3 km from Shenkottai and 1 km from Shenkottai Railway Station.

== Population ==
There are around 1500 inhabitants, approximately 500 families in 300 houses.

== Description and history ==
The village was founded by members of a single family; residents are therefore all related. The area was formerly ruled by a king called Kalangathakandy Raja; parts of the royal palace remain. There is a temple to the goddess called Kalangathakandy Amman or Bagavathy Amman. She is popular in Kerala, to which Shenkottai belonged until 1956.

There is a small dam, which was built by the king. The main source of income is agriculture: coconuts, mangoes, jack fruit, cashews, ground nuts and rice are the main crops.

Harijan Primary School is located in the village.
