= Perumal Nagar =

Village in India

Perumal Nagar is a village situated 5 km in east of Nanguneri, in Tirunelveli district in the Indian state of Tamil Nadu.

== Taluk ==
Nanguneri is a Taluk Headquarters in the District of Tirunelveli situate at a distance of 18 miles (29 km) from the headquarters of the District. The place gained importance for the location of a famous Vaishnavite temple commonly known as Totadri Mutt. The Jeer (Spiritual Head) at Vanamamalai at Nanguneri commands wide reputation over Thenkalai Vaishnavites. He exercises unfettered powers over the subordinate monasteries numbering over 200 scattered all over India.

== District ==
The city of Tirunelveli is the district headquarters. A unique feature of this district is that it consists of all five geographical traditions of Tamil Literature; Kurinji (mountains), Mullai (forest), Marudham (paddy fields), Neithal (coastal) and Palai (desert). Tirunelveli District was formed on 1 September 1790 by the East India Company (British Government) which comprises present Tirunelveli and Tuticorin district and parts of Virudhunagar and Ramanathapuram district. It is the second largest district as in October 2008 after Villupuram district.
