= Deivaseyalpuram =

Coordinates: 8.738332°N 77.918746°E

Deivacheyalpuram, also known as Deivaseyalpuram, is a village located in Thoothukudi district of Tamil Nadu, India.

== Etymology ==
Deivaseyalpuram can be read from Tamil components Deiva (divine/god), Seyal (act/deed) and puram (settlement): roughly “the village of divine deeds” or “the settlement of God’s work.”
