= Athuvazhi =

Athuvazhi is a village in the Nellai district of Tamil Nadu, India.

Most of the people here are agriculturists.

This village has the privilege of "Thallaiyanai".

A hidden tourist place.

Dharani sugar factory here has been ruining this village for more than 20 years. Even after many opposes by the people from village it is staying a weed to be ploughed out. It is polluting the village and ruining the reserve forest area. Animals in the forest are coming out of the forest because of the effects of sugar factory, many reportedly been affected by diseases.

This is a developing village in education. A school and college are there within the village.
