= Mariathaipuram =

Coordinates: 8°58′25″N 77°27′54″E

Mariathaipuram is a village located in Tenkasi district, Tamil Nadu, India. Mariathaipuram village is located near Surandai. Most of the people are Christian. The people are mainly involved in agricultural activities. Our Lady of Assumption Church is in the middle of the village.The festival of the village is held on 15 August of every year. St.Luke's Hospital is there near the bus stop and R.C.Middle School is within the Church Campus.

== Events ==
- Mariathaipuram church Festival month of August
- Mariathaipuram Pongal festival
- Mariathaipuram Christmas and New Year festival
- Mariathaipuram church Festival month of May
- Mariathaipuram church Festival -Easter
