= Sorimuthu Ayyanar Temple =

Hindu temple in Tamil Nadu, India

Sorimuthu Ayyanar Temple is the temple located in Mundhunthurai reserve forest in a dense jungle which is between Papanasam and Karaiyar Dam in Tamil Nadu. It is located 12 km from Papanasam and 61 km from Thirunelveli. Its presiding deity is Mahalinga Swamy. Lord Dharma Sastha (Ayyappa) appears with his left leg bent and the right hanging down. The temple is under the administration of Singampatti Zamin, who maintains the temple. An estimated 2 lakh devotees come to Karayar on Thai and Adi Amavasya (new moon) days. All Amavasya days are observed. People erect tents to stay in the temple up to a month in advance. They bring with them provisions for cooking to fulfill their prayer commitments.
