= Puliyankudi =

Puliyangudi
- Town
- Puliyangudi, Tamil Nadu
- Coordinates: 09.172500°N 77.395600°E
- Country: India
- State: Tamil Nadu
- District: Tenkasi
- Taluk: Kadayanallur
- Named for: (Lemon City)

Government
  - Type: Second Grade Municipality
  - Rank: 3rd in district
- Elevation: 233 m (764 ft)

Population (2011)
  - Total: 66,034

Languages
  - Official: Tamil
- Time zone: UTC+5:30 (IST)
- Telephone code: 4636 (Sankarankovil Telephone Code)
- Vehicle registration: TN-79 (Sankarankovil RTO)
- 2nd Grade Municipality

Puliyangudi is a town located in Tenkasi district. The town located between Tenkasi and Rajapalayam on the National Highway 208 (Kollam to Tirumangalam).

It falls under the administrative jurisdiction of Tenkasi District and Kadayanallur Taluk. Taluk headquarters, Kadayanallur, is 16 km south from Puliyangudi, and the district headquarters, Tenkasi lies 31 km south. It is nicknamed the "Lemon City of India". The climate, soil, and marketing facilities in Puliyangudi are particularly suitable for lemon cultivation. It has two big lemon markets located in Puliyangudi and Punnaiyapuram lemon markets especially for exporting lemons in daily Tamilnadu other districts area and Kerala state. Puliyangudi's Big Mosque or Jumma Masjid, built by the Lebbai family (Lebbai Sha), holds significant historical and cultural importance. The Lebbai family was influential in the early period, playing a central role in leading the Muslim community in Puliyangudi.

== Geography ==
Puliyangudi is located at 09.172500°N 77.395600°E. It is mainly an agricultural based town and is famous for its Lemon market; Puliyangudi is also nicknamed 'Lemon City'. During the past years the economic driver of the town was agriculture & allied activities.

Puliyangudi town is spread across an area of 55.16 sq.km and it is divided into 33 wards. The town is located at the junction of roads from Madurai, Rajapalayam, Sankarankovil Kovilpatti, Surandai,Kadayanallur, Tenkasi, Sengottai and Kollam. The town is surrounded in the north by Vasudevanallur Town Panchayat and in the south by Punnaiyapuram Village Panchayat. Mullikulam Village Panchayat forms the physical boundary of Puliyangudi in eastern directions. Reserve forest area forms a boundary along western side.

== Demographics ==
Religious census
Religion	Percent(%)
Hindu	72.22%
Muslim	20.88%
Christian	6.81%
Sikh	0.01%
Other	0.07%

As per the religious census of 2011, Puliyangudi (M) had 72.22% Hindus, 20.88% Muslims, 6.81% Christians, 0.01% Sikhs and 0.07% following other religions.

== Agriculture ==
Puliyangudi city is known for the cultivation of limes. The climate, soil and marketing facilities are quite suitable for the cultivation of this crop, making this city the leader in lime cultivation. Hence, Tamil Nadu Agricultural University has established the Tamil Nadu Citrus Research Station in its neighbouring town Sankarankovil.

== Schools ==
As per 2009-10 Administration Report there are 66 schools in this municipal town.

- Higher Secondary Schools - 7
- High Schools. - 31
- Matriculation Schools - 4
- Middle Schools - 10
- Primary Schools - 14

== Other training institutes ==
- Marutham TNPSC Coaching school
- Puliyangudi Academic Achievements Resource Trust (PAART) TNPSC Coaching Center
