= Odaikkarai =

Village in Tamil Nadu, India

- Village
- Location within Tamil Nadu Location within India
- Coordinates: 09°44′36″N 78°47′14″E
- Country: India
- State: Tamil Nadu
- District: Ramanathapuram
- Taluk: Tiruvadanai

Government
  - Type: Sarpanch

Area
  - Total: 4.02 km^{2} (1.55 sq mi)
- Elevation: 27 m (89 ft)

Population (2011)
  - Total: 394
  - Density: 98.0/km^{2} (254/sq mi)

Languages
  - Official: Tamil
- Time zone: UTC+5:30 (IST)
- PIN: 623401
- STD code: 04561
- Vehicle registration: TN-65

Odaikkarai is a village in Tiruvadanai Taluk, Ramanathapuram District, Tamil Nadu, India. It is located near the southern tip of the Indian subcontinent, about 43 kilometres north of the district seat Ramanathapuram, and 15 kilometres west of the taluk seat Tiruvadanai. As of the year 2011, it had a population of 394.

== Geography ==
Odaikkarai is situated on the eastern shore of Anandur Periya Lake, and covers an area of 402.25 hectares.

== Demographics ==
According to the 2011 Census of India, there were a total of 149 households in Odaikkarai. Among the local residents, 175 are male and 219 are female. The overall literacy rate was 62.69%, with 126 of the male population and 121 of the female population being literate.
