= Thachanallur =

Town in Tirunelveli, Tamil Nadu, India

Thachanallur is a town in Tirunelveli, Tamil Nadu, India.The small town is near 1 km from Tirunelveli Junction. There are many small industries in the town like Beeti manufacturers (tobacco products), brass vessels manufacturers, aluminum vessels manufacturers, cotton spinning mills, sugar mill factory etc. The areas under this town includes Balaji Avenue, Gokul Nagar, Nelmeipper Nagar which is full of educated upper middle class people. Thachanallur is one of the entry point of Tirunelveli District. The town is 40 km away from Tutucorin airport.

The inscription says that the area Thachanallur was called as Thachanoor in 1232 AD.

== History ==
Located in Thirunelveli, Thachanallur, the Varamtharum Perumal temple is 700 years old. There is a small story that exists behind the name called Thachanallur. Early days carpenters who are called as "Thachars" in tamil who did carpentry works for "The Great Nellaiappar temple" (Temple of Lord Shiva) in Tirunelveli Town lived here and as a replica of "The Great Nellaiappar Temple" which is located in Tirunelveli Town the carpenters build a Lord Shiva temple in Thachanallur. Inspired from those Thachars the town was named as "Thachanallur"

The inscription on the temple says that the area was called Thachanoor in 1232 AD. Thachanoor was in “Keezha Naattu Veampu” division of the two countries that bordered the Thamiraparani river at that time. According to the records, the temple was built by King Marthanda Varmar in 1734 BC and by King Vallabha Mangalam.

The King Kulasekara Pandya has made the people feel the need to take good care of the temple. The temple was also well maintained by King Sundhara Paandiya and KingThirumalai Nayak of Madurai in 16th century AD. The inscriptions here indicate that the kings of Madurai came to worship here for important events in Madurai.

== See also ==
- Thachanallur Pastorate
