= List of gram panchayats in Tamil Nadu =

Gram panchayat councils (Tamil: ஊராட்சி மன்றங்கள், romanized: Uratci Manrankal, lit. 'village government council') are political divisions of Tamil Nadu towns that have a population of 500 or more. They are responsible for running and maintaining the public infrastructure at the local level. As of 2020, there are a total of 12,524 panchayat councils in Tamil Nadu.

== Election of panchayat council ==
The panchayats are further divided into wards according to their population. Members of the panchayat councils are elected for a five-year term by the voters in these wards. The chairman is directly elected by the people, while the vice-chairman is elected by the ward members of the panchayat. They are responsible for the execution of tasks and decisions made by the majority of the members in the panchayat council. No political party is allowed to contest for these posts of members and chairman.

Voters in panchayat areas cast four votes for the following four posts: panchayat ward member, panchayat chairperson, panchayat union committee member, and district ward member. Borough, municipal and corporation electors cast one vote for ward members only.

== Responsibilities ==
- Installation of street lights
- Construction of village roads
- Supply of drinking water
- Construction of sewage canal
- Construction of small bridges
- Maintenance of village libraries
- Construction of prefabricated houses
- Establishment and maintenance of recreational and sports grounds for youth

== Gram Sabha and Gram Sabha Meeting ==
In the meeting of the villagers, which is convened four times a year in every panchayat councils, the report on the completed project works should be submitted to the public in the presence of the panchayat council chairperson and the government officers about the projects such as education, social development, transportation, public health, employment of the village.

== See also ==
- Gram panchayat
- Block (district subdivision)
