= Kuruvikulam block =

Kuruvikulam block is a revenue block in the Tenkasi district of Tamil Nadu, India. It has a total of 43 panchayat villages.
