= Pudupatti, Tirunelveli =

Village in India

Pudupatti is a small town in Alangulam block in Tirunelveli district of Tamil Nadu, India. It is located 26 km towards west from District headquarters Tirunelveli, 2 km from Alangulam, 651 km from state capital Chennai.

Pudupatti Pin code is 627851 and postal head office is Alangulam.

Nallur ( 2 km ), Sivalarkulam ( 5 km ), Andipatti ( 6 km ), Odaimarichan ( 7 km ), Naranapuram ( 7 km ) are the nearby Villages to Pudupatti. Pudupatti is surrounded by Pappakudi Block towards South, Kadayam Block towards west, Keelapavoor Block towards west, Ambasamudram Block towards South.

Vikramasingapuram, Surandai, Tenkasi, Tirunelveli, Alangulam are the nearby cities to Pudupatti.

== Pudupatti 2011 census details ==
Pudupatti local language is Tamil. Pudupatti village total population is 10171 and number of houses are 3359. Female Population is 51.1%. Village literacy rate is 67.7% and the female literacy rate is 31.5%.

=== Population ===
Census Parameter	Census Data
Total Population	10171
Total No of Houses	3359
Female Population %	51.1 % ( 7644)
Total Literacy rate %	67.7 % ( 8501)
Female Literacy rate	31.5 % ( 1631)
Scheduled Tribes Population %	0.0 % ( 0)
Scheduled Caste Population %	12.0 % ( 618)
Working Population %	58.1 %
Child(0 -6) Population by 2011	677
Girl Child(0 -6) Population % by 2011	51.3 % ( 347)

=== Politics in Pudupatti ===
DMK, AIADMK, ADMK, NTK, INC are the major political parties in this area.

==== Polling stations /booths near Pudupatti ====
1. T.d.t.a. Middle School
2. T.d.t.a.middle School Additional Building North Portion Pethanadarpatti.
3. Panchayat Union Primary School East Building South Portion Maruthampudur
4. T.d.t.a.middle School North Building East Portion
5. T.d.t.a Primary School South Portion Sadaiyappapuram Mukkudal.

== How to reach Pudupatti ==
=== By rail ===
There is no railway station near Pudupatti in less than 10 km.

== Education ==
=== Colleges near Pudupatti ===
Ithaya Jyothi College of Nursing Address :Caussanelpuram, konganthanparai - Post, tirunelveli - 627007

S.veerachamy College of Engineering and Technology Address :Puliangudi

P.s.r. Engineering College Address :P.s.r. Engineering College, Near By Sivakasi.

Gomathi Ambal Polytechnic College Malaiyadikurichi Address :Maaveeran Poolithevar Nagar Maliyadikurichi.

Sri Parasakthi Women's College Address :

=== Schools in Pudupatti ===
Hindu Tirumurugan Middle School Address :Hindu Tirumurugan Middle School, Santhai Market. Pudupatti

T.D.T.A Middle school Address: near CsI church

Government High School, Pudupatti

Saruga International CBSE School, Pudupatti

=== Sub Villages in Pudupatti ===
Adi dravida colony

Ramnagar

Kasi nathapuram

Kamarajar Nagar

Sivan Nagar

Surya Nagar

Rajiv Nagar

Ambedkar Nagar

== Hospitals in Pudupatti ==
=== Ram Hospital ===
MDR922; Pudupatti; Tamil Nadu 627851; India 0.9 km distance

=== primary health center ===
Maruthamputhur; Tamil Nadu 627851; India 2.1 km distance

=== ஜோசப் மருத்துவமனை ===
Alangulam; Tamil Nadu 627851; India 4.2 km distance

=== Maniram Hospital ===
Alangulam; Tamil Nadu 627851; India 4.5 km distance

=== Beedi workers Hospital ===
Ambedkar Nagar, Pudupatti 627851

== Economy ==
=== Petrol Bunks in Pudupatti ===
==== Indian Oil Petrol Pump ====
Aaladi Patti; Tirunelveli; SH-39; Tirunelveli Sengottai Kollam Road; Tirunelveli; Tirunelveli; 627851; India 4.3 km distance

==== Rathinam Nadar Agency - Indiane Oil Pertrol Pump ====
Sivakasi - Alangulam Road; Alangulam; Tamil Nadu 627851; India 5.0 km distance

==== SRI BHARATH AGENCIES ====
ALANKULAM; SH39; TIRUNELVELI; Tamil Nadu 627851; India 5.1 km distance

==== Indian Oil Petrol Pump ====
Alangulam; Tirunelveli; SH-39; Tirunelveli Sengottai Kollam Road; Tirunelveli; Tirunelveli; Tamil Nadu 627808; India 5.5 km distance

== St. Mariam Polytechnic College ==
Tenkasi – Tirunelveli Road; Alangulam; Sivalarkulam Village; Tirunelveli; Tamil Nadu 627851; India 4.8 km distance

== Aaladi Aruna College of Nursing ==
tirunelveli; aalangulam; Tirunelveli; Tamil Nadu 627754; India 4.9 km distance

== St Mariyam Polytechnic College ==
Tirunelveli; Tamil Nadu 627001; India 4.9 km distance

== ST. PAUL'S CHURCH ==
Pudupatti; Tamil Nadu 627851; India 1.0 km distance

== TDTA Middle school ==
Pudupatti; Tamil Nadu 627851; India 1.1 km distance

== Puddupatti School ==
MDR922; Pudupatti; Tamil Nadu 627851; India 1.1 km distance

== hindu thirumurugan high school ==
Pudupatti; Tamil Nadu 627851; India 1.2 km distance

== Kulanthai Yeasu Church ==
Ram Nagar; Tamil Nadu 627851; India 2.4 km distance

=== Electronic Shops in Pudupatti ===
==== Vetri Vel Auto Mobiles ====
Ram Nagar; Tamil Nadu 627851; India 2.3 km distance

==== Vinayaga Auto Works ====
Ambasamudram-Alangulam Rd; Kuthapanjan, Pudupatti; Tamil Nadu 627851; India 2.5 km distance

==== Lingson TV Centre ====
No. 46/3; Walaja Road; Sholinghur; Tamil Nadu 631102; India 4.3 km distance

=== Super Markets in Pudupatti ===
==== Jesumani Store; Kandapatti ====
Maruthamputhur; Tamil Nadu 627851; India 2.6 km distance

==== Mani Road ====
Alangulam; Tamil Nadu 627851; India 4.8 km distance

==== Thaiyal Nayagi Vegetable Market ====
Sivakasi - Alangulam Road; Alangulam; Tamil Nadu 627851; India 5.0 km distance

== Police Stations near Pudupatti, Pappakudi ==
=== Police Station ===
Tenkasi Road; SH 40; Alangulam; Tamil Nadu 627851; India 4.6 km distance

=== Women's Police Station ===
Alangulam; Tamil Nadu 627851; India 5.0 km distance

=== Police Quarters ===
Tenkasi Rd; Alangulam; Tamil Nadu 627851; India 5.2 km distance

== Government offices near Pudupatti, Pappakudi ==
=== Maruthamputhur ===
Maruthamputhur; Alangulam(Tk); Tirunelveli; Tamil Nadu - 627851; India 2.1 km distance

=== Village Panchayat Service Centre; Sivalarkulam ===
Sivalarkulam; Tamil Nadu 627853; India 6.3 km distance

=== Seyathu Beedi ===
Muthumalaipuram; Tamil Nadu 627851; India 6.6 km distance
