= Kuttam =

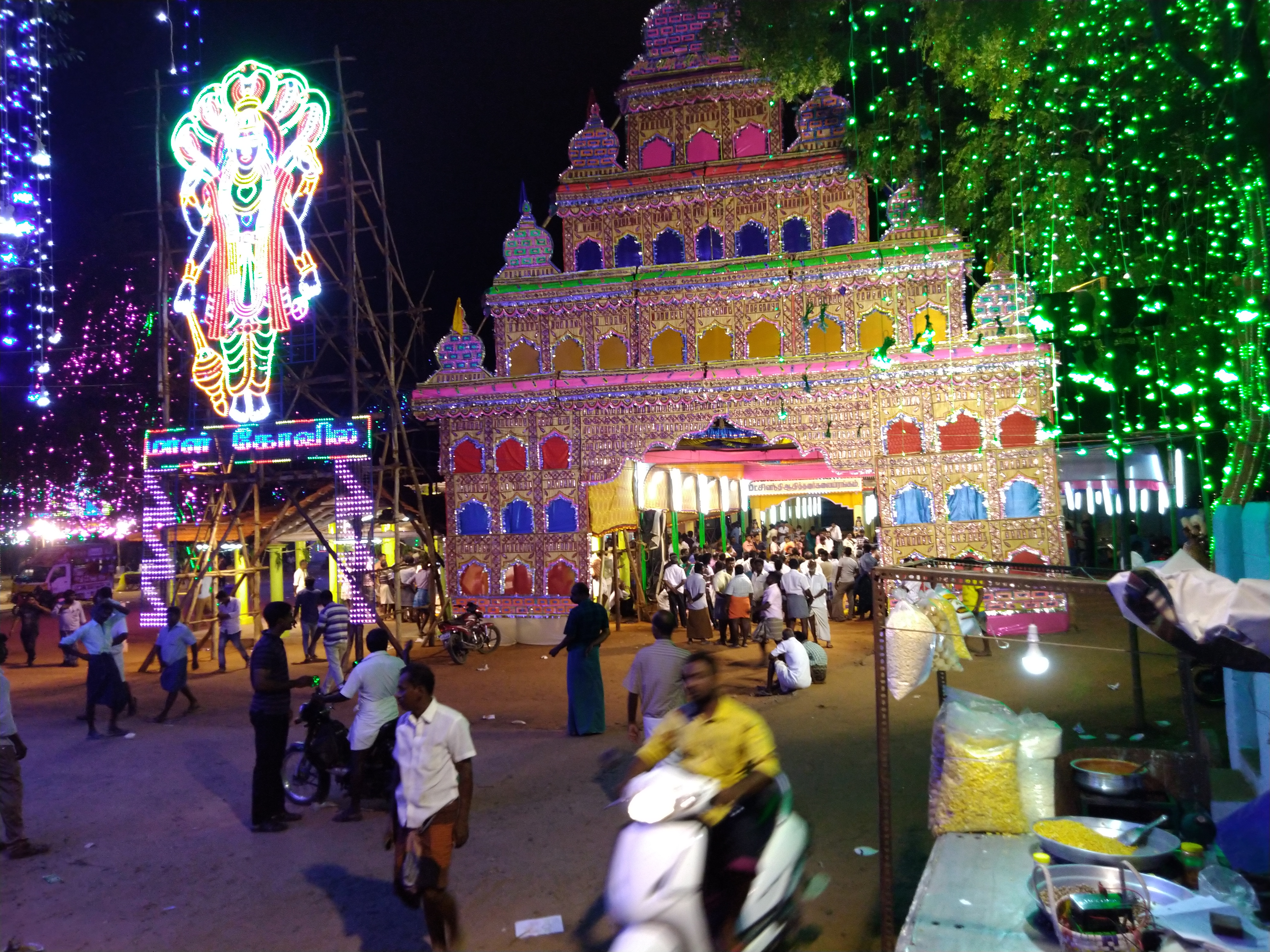
Grand festival in Kuttam

Kuttam is a village in the Tirunelveli District of Tamil Nadu, India. It comes under the administration of Thisayanvilai taluk (revenue block). This village is located on the ECR highway between Nagercoil and Tuticorin, just 1 km away from the sea. It is home to the famous Anandha Valli Amman Temple, which features a tamarind tree known as the Sanjeev Tree. Uniquely, the leaves of this tree do not close at night, giving the impression that it does not sleep. The leaves of this tree are believed to have medicinal properties and are used to cure diseases. It is also believed that the tree blesses childless couples with the boon of parenthood. People often carry the leaves with them during travel, believing it symbolizes the blessing of Amman and ensures their safety on the journey.
