= Soundrapandiapuram =

- village
- Country: India
- State: Tamil Nadu
- District: Tirunelveli

Population (March 2009)
  - Total: 935

Languages
  - Official: Tamil
- Time zone: UTC+5:30 (IST)
- PIN: 627113
- Telephone code: 04637
- Vehicle registration: TN 72
- Nearest city: Vallioor
- Sex ratio: 1:1 ♂/♀
- Literacy: 83%
- Website: www.souhaistars.com%20,%20www.soundrapandiapuram.com

Soundrapandiapuram (Soundra Pandia Puram ) is a village of Tirunelveli district in Radhapuram Taluk, Tamil Nadu, India. The nearby railway station and town is Valliyoor.

Although majority of the community are Christians, there are also Hindus in good numbers. They maintain a traditional relationship among each other, which is carried along the generation.

It has a pre-primary school and a middle school, which name is St. Aloysius Middle School (Standard 1 to 8).

Farming and business are the main activities. Since Soundra Pandia Puram is in lower ground to the nearby village bonds, ground water is always available.
