= Melapalayam =

- Neighbourhood
- Location within Tamil Nadu Location within India
- Coordinates: 8.7000°N 77.7069°E
- Country: India
- State: Tamil Nadu
- District: Tirunelveli
- City: Tirunelveli

Government
  - Type: Municipal Corporation
  - Body: Tirunelveli City Municipal Corporation

Population
  - Total: 227,895
- Time zone: UTC+05:30 (IST)
- Pincode: 627005
- Telephone code: 91 (0)462
- Vehicle registration: TN 72

Melapalayam is a neighborhood of Tirunelveli City in Tamil Nadu, India situated on the east bank of the Thamirabarani River. The neighborhood's name comes from its location west (Tamil: mela) of Palayamkottai. Eighty percent of the population is Muslim.

Melapalayam is 4.1 kilometres (2.5 mi) west of downtown Tirunelveli and is an administrative zone of the Tirunelveli City Municipal Corporation.

== Education ==
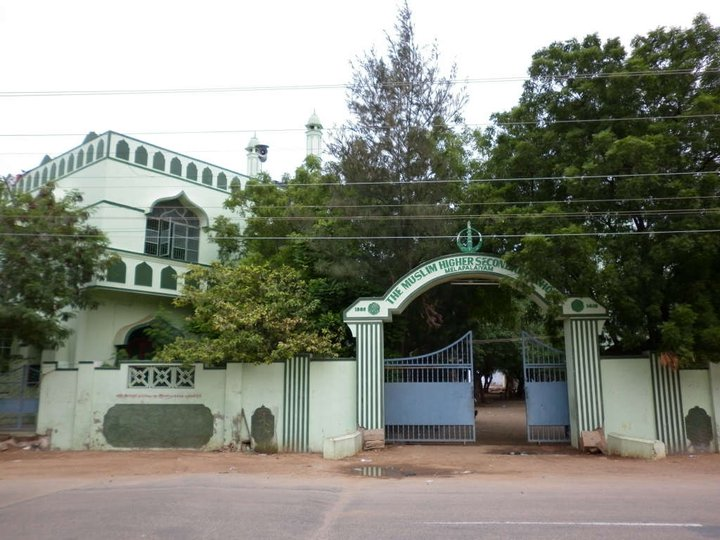
New look of The Muslim Higher Secondary School

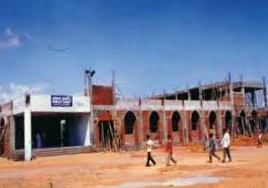
Annai Hajira College

Higher secondary schools in the neighborhood are classified as Government Aided Minority Institutions. Part of the student community of Melapalayam travels to Palayamkottai for education.

They include Annai Hajira Women's College and Government College of Engineering Tirunelveli.

== Culture ==
=== Marriage ===
The area has its own marriage traditions. Residents would often marry within the city and marriages would generally be held at the local mosque. Before marriage, participants must obtain an NOC (No Objection Certificate) from a mosque or jamath. The marriage feast is also famous for the unique "Thaalcha", known locally as "Kathirikkaanam" (main ingredient is Brinjal) made with Ghee rice and Biriyani. Normally the feast is called as "Kalari".

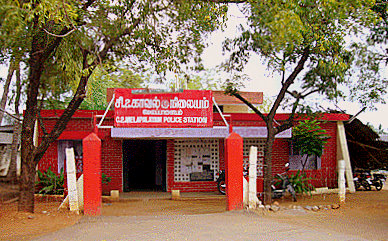
Police Station
