= Adaichani =

- Village Panchayat
- Location in Tamil Nadu, India Adaichani (India)
- Coordinates: 8°44′53″N 77°27′22″E
- Country: India
- State: Tamil Nadu
- District: Tirunelveli

Languages
  - Official: Tamil
- Time zone: UTC+5:30 (IST)
- PIN: 627413
- Telephone code: 04634
- Lok Sabha constituency: Tirunelveli
- Vidhan Sabha constituency: Cheranmahadevi
- Website: pallakkalpothukudi.blogspot.com

Adaichani is a village panchayat situated in the Tirunelveli locale of Tamil Nadu state, India. It is surrounded by Pallakkal Pothukudi, Edaikal, and Papakudi.
