= Avaraikulam =

Avaraikulam Asaiyaa Pattinam
- Village
- Location in Tamil Nadu, India Avaraikulam (India)
- Coordinates: 8.2345°N 77.5730°E
- Country: India
- State: Tamil Nadu
- District: Tirunelveli

Languages
  - Official: Tamil
- Time zone: UTC+5:30 (IST)
- PIN: 627133
- Telephone code: 04637
- Vehicle registration: TN-72
- Nearest city: Nagercoil
- Lok Sabha constituency: Tirunelveli

Avaraikulam is a village in the Tirunelveli district of Tamil Nadu, India. It is located 72 km (45 mi) from Tirunelveli and 20 km (12 mi) from Kanyakumari and Nagercoil.

== Places of attraction ==
There are more than ten Hindu temples and two churches, one of them being the Roman Catholic church with St. Xavier as patron, which was constructed in the year 1907.

Ayya Vaikundar Nizhalthangal is a divine place to visit on the village situated on Vaikunda Street, next to the Mutharamman temple.

== Present status of Avaraikulam ==
People in Avaraikulam are the descendants of the Pandiyan Kingdom and hail from Poochikadu and Kurumbur, near Tiruchendur.

The people living in Avaraikulam are mostly of the Nadar community. More than 95% of the village's population are farmers, and most of them cultivate flowers. Avaraikulam is famous for Jasmine, Rose, Kenthi, Vadamalli, Pitchi and Chevvanthi cultivation. All these flowers are collected by small traders and sold in the markets of nearby towns.

There is a Onshore Pooling Station at Avaraikulam maintained by the Central Electricity Authority.

== Education ==
Baliah Marthandam Higher Secondary School is attended by young people in Avaraikulam and the surrounding villages. A few other private schools are also in the village.

== Transport facilities ==
Avarikulam is well connected by road . It is located on NH 44, the longest running north- south highway of India, the four-lane express way provides good connectivity to Avaraikulam. Scheduled bus services are available to Tirunelveli, Nagercoil, Kanyakumari. The Nearest Railway Station Valliyur Railway station is 18 km (11 mi) to North, NagerCoil Railway Station is 20 km (12 mi) to West and Kanyakumari Railway Station is 20 km (12 mi) to South, The train connections with Chennai, Bengaluru, Mumbai, Delhi, Howrah, etc.

Nearest airport is Thoothukkudi Airport, 75 km (47 mi) away. Thiruvananthapuram International Airport, 130 km (81 mi) away, and Madurai International Airport, 220 km (140 mi) away, also serve the people of Avaraikulam.

Destinations from Ariyananyagipuram

	Nagercoil	
	^	
Kanyakumari	< Avaraikulam >	Valliyur
	v	
	Radhapuram	

== List of Ward Under Avaraikulam Panchayat ==
- Ambalavanapuram
- Avaraikulam
- Chembikulam
- Mathaganeri
- Pillaiyar Kudieruppu
