= Kurumbalaperi =

- town
- Interactive map of Kurumbalaperi
- Coordinates: 8°55′37.93″N 77°23′18.33″E
- Country: India
- State: Tamil Nadu
- District: Tirunelveli

Population (2009)
  - Total: 20 Thousand

Languages
  - Official: Tamil
- Time zone: UTC+5:30 (IST)
- PIN: 627806
- Telephone code: 04633,9600346346
- Vehicle registration: TN-72 & TN-76
- Nearest city: Tenkasi
- Literacy: 40%%
- Lok Sabha constituency: Tenkasi
- Vidhan Sabha constituency: Tenkasi
- Climate: Min 20 Deg Celsius Max 35 Deg Celsius (Köppen)
- Website: www.kurumbalapery.blogspot.com

Kurumbalaperi is a small village located near Pavoorchatram in Tenkasi Taluk, Tenkasi District, in the Indian state of Tamil Nadu. It is located between Pavoorchatram, Kilapavoor and Melapavoor. People of diverse religious practices live in the area. Kurumbalaperi has a temple called Badhrakali Amman Temple. Its festival is very famous. The village was named for the groves of kurumbala (a small jackfruit) trees in the area. The vast majority of the inhabitants work in agriculture. One noteworthy feature is a large temple called Pathirakali Amman temple that was constructed in the village.

== Education ==
Kurumbalaperi has two Tamil primary schools, one middle school, one Tamil medium high school, and one English medium primary school. At Pavoorchatram, One Government higher secondary schools are available.The same school from the first year of high school, and it transitioned to a higher secondary school in the academic year 2017-2018.

== Temple ==
kurumbaleri pathrakali amman temple very famous.This temple is very famous in that area. The temple festival, spanning four days, is celebrated with devotion, grandeur, and significance.

== Transport ==
The village has bus terminals and one railway station (2k distance).
