= Alangulam, Tenkasi =

Town in Tenkasi, Tamil Nadu

Alangulam
- Municipality
- Location in Tamil Nadu, India
- Coordinates: 8.87°N 77.5°E
- Country: India
- State: Tamil Nadu
- District: Tenkasi, Formerly Tirunelveli District

Government
  - Type: Primary municipality
- Elevation: 127 m (417 ft)

Population (2011)
  - Total: 20,948

Languages
  - Official: Tamil
- Time zone: UTC+5:30 (IST)
- PIN: 627851
- Telephone code: +91-04633
- Vehicle registration: TN 76
- Sex ratio: 1000 :1040.5 ♂/♀
- Literacy: 74.5%
- Lok Sabha constituency: Tirunelveli
- Vidhan Sabha constituency: Alangulam
- Website: www.alangulam.in

Alangulam is a Primary Municipality city in Tenkasi district, Tamil Nadu, India. It is a Special Grade Town Panchayat and the centre of the Alangulam Taluk in Tenkasi district. (Alangulam Municipality)

== Geography ==
Alangulam is located at 8.87°N 77.5°E. It is situated at an average elevation of 127 metres (416 feet).

== Demographics ==
As of 2001 India census, Alangulam had a population of around 17,922 as per the 2001 census. Males constitute 49% of the population and females 51%. Alangulam has an average literacy rate of 69%, higher than the national average of 59.5%; with 54% of the males and 46% of females literate. 14% of the population is under 6 years of age.

== Government and politics ==
=== Assembly Constituency ===
Alangulam is a constituency for the Tamil Nadu Legislative Assembly. P. H. Manoj Pandian has been the elected Assembly Member for Alangulam in the 2021 Tamil Nadu Legislative Assembly election.

=== Firkas under Alangualm Taluk ===
Alangulam is the administrative centre of the Alangulam taluka within Tirunelveli District, and is subdivided into following five Firka.

- Keelapavoor
- Pudupatti
- Nettur
- Alangulam
- Venkatampatti

== Notable people ==
- SS Ramasubbu, Politician and MP

== Transportation ==
Alangulam is connected by state highways to Tirunelveli (29 km) towards the east, to Tenkasi (24 km) towards the west, to Ambasamudram (20 km) towards the south, to Surandai (17 km) towards the north west Sankarankovil (48 km) towards the north.
