= Pavoorchatram =

- Village (Kallurani, Kulasekarapatti)
- Location in Tamil Nadu, India Pavoorchatram (India)
- Coordinates: 8°54′52″N 77°22′40″E
- Country: India
- State: Tamil Nadu
- District: Tenkasi

Languages
  - Official: Tamil
- Time zone: UTC+5:30 (IST)

Pavoorchatram is a sub village in Tenkasi district, Tamil Nadu, India.

== Geography ==
Pavoorchatram situated in the foothills of Western Ghats, between Tuticorin and Quilon highway National highway. Pavoorchatram is 9 km (5.6 mi) east of Tenkasi and 45 km (28 mi) west of Tirunelveli, on the Tenkasi-Tirunelveli State Highway. The nearest popular train stations are Tenkasi and Tirunelveli. Pavoorchatram has a railway station.

== Commerce ==
The Kamarajar market in Pavoorchatram attracts large vendors and wholesale merchants from across Tamil Nadu. Vegetables from local farmers, and from Karnataka and Maharashtra are sold in large quantities ahead of the Pongal festival.
