= Radhapuram taluk =

Coordinates: 8°16′03″N 77°40′38″E

Radhapuram taluk is a taluk of Tirunelveli district of the Indian state of Tamil Nadu. The headquarters is the town of Radhapuram. Radhapuram is also a legislative assembly constituency in Tirunelveli district. The constituency has been in existence since 1957 election. This taluk has the longest coastline. The Chettikulam beach is almost 3 km which lies in straight line. The total land area is of 31.63 square kilometer and has a population of around 8000 with male population being the higher. North panakudi is the nearest railway station to Radhapuram.

== Demographics ==
According to the 2011 census, the taluk of Radhapuram had a population of 302,268 with 149,056 males and 153,212 females. There were 1028 women for every 1000 men. The taluk had a literacy rate of 79.67. Child population in the age group below 6 was 16,219 Males and 15,620 Females.

== See also ==
- Chempadu
- Soundrapandiapuram
