= Sankarankovil =

Sankarankovil Punnai Vanam, Sankarankoil
- Town
- Nickname: Sangai
- Location in Tenkasi district, Tamil Nadu, India
- Coordinates: 9.16°N 77.55°E
- Country: India
- State: Tamil Nadu
- District: Tenkasi
- Taluk: Sankarankovil

Government
  - Type: First Grade Municipality
  - Member of Legislative Assembly: E. Raja
- Elevation: 143 m (469 ft)

Population (2011)
  - Total: 70,574

Languages
  - Official: Tamil
- Time zone: UTC+5:30 (IST)
- PIN: 627756
- Telephone code: +91 – 4636
- Vehicle registration: TN-79 (Sankarankovil RTO)

Sankarankovil is a town in the Tenkasi district in the Indian state of Tamil Nadu. It is located on the eastern slopes of Western Ghats. The town houses the Sankara Narayanasamy Temple. Sankarankovil is also 3rd is largest town in Tenkasi district.

== History ==
Sankarankovil is home to the Sankara Narayanar Temple, which was built by Ugra Pandiyan in 900 BC. Houses the deity by the name Sankara Narayanan, which is half Shiva and the other half Vishnu. According to folklore, the devotees of Hari (Vishnu) and Shiva once quarreled with each other to determine which god was more powerful, until Shiva appeared as Sankaranarayanar to show his devotees that Hari and Shiva were one and the same. Thus, it is held sacred by Saivites and those Hindus who believe that Shiva and Vishnu are a single deity. Srivaishnavites of Tamil Nadu who worship Vishnu only do not accept this and hence reject the temple. The deities of the temple are Sankareswarar, Gomathi Amman and Sankaranarayanar. Sankarankovil is also said to be home to the deity named Avudai Ambal.

In older times, the city was called as Sankaranayinarkoil. It is also noted for the "Adi Thabasu" festival.

There is a belief that the sand from the temple, known as puttrumann (puttru meaning ant hill, mann meaning sand) is capable of curing all diseases. Devotees believe that Sankarankovil's Nagachunai (sacred tank) was dug by serpent kings named Paduman and Sangam, and has a miraculous power to heal those who bath there. Once, a deva called Manikkeerivan was cursed by the goddess Parvathi and, as a result, had to come to earth and work as a gardener in a beautiful garden. One day while he was clearing a snake pit, the snake's tail was also cut. He found a lingam next to the snake. He went and informed his king, Ugra Pandiyan. The king considered it to be the god's wish to stay there and constructed the temple and a city around it.

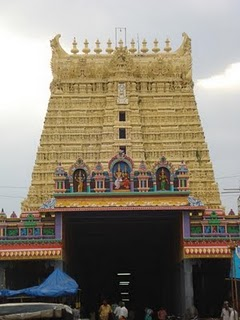
Sankaranarayanar koil, Sankarankoil, Tenkasi district

== Demographics ==
According to 2011 census, Sankarankoil had a population of 70, 574 with a sex-ratio of 1,012 females for every 1,000 males, much above the national average of 929. A total of 5,660 were under the age of six, constituting 2,867 males and 2,793 females. Scheduled Castes and Scheduled Tribes accounted for 22.47% and .3% of the population respectively. The average literacy of the town was 74.9%, compared to the national average of 72.99%. The town had a total of 14536 households. There were a total of 24,064 workers, comprising 493 cultivators, 2,003 main agricultural labourers, 2,245 in house hold industries, 17,190 other workers, 2,133 marginal workers, 34 marginal cultivators, 247 marginal agricultural labourers, 413 marginal workers in household industries and 1,439 other marginal workers. Hindus are the majority in the town with 90% of the population, followed by Islam (5%), and Christianity (5%).

== Politics ==
Sankarankovil Assembly constituency is part of Tenkasi Lok Sabha constituency. Dileepan Jayashankar from ADMK.

== Economy ==
Apart from agribusiness, the town is known for its textiles. Nearly 4000 powerlooms are directly involved in producing various kinds of textile products such as terry towels, cotton saris, lungis, handkerchiefs, etc. The produced products are marketed all over India directly.

== Transport ==
Neighbouring cities & towns

=== Air ===
Tuticorin Airport is the nearest airport located 95.4 km (59.3 mi) from Sankarankovil. SpiceJet serves Tuticorin with two flights from Chennai.

The nearest international airports are Madurai (120 km) and Thiruvananthapuram (148 kms.) away from Sankarankovil. These airports connect with Chennai, Sri Lanka, Singapore and other major cities of India.

=== Road ===
Sankarankovil has two bus stands. The main bus stand is near the Sankarankovil Municipality office, and is also called the Anna Bus Stand. The new bus stand is nearby to the Sankarankovil Taluk office, and is also called the Thanthai Periyar New Bus Stand.

Sankarankovil is situated at the intersection of State Highways 41 and 76.

The main bus routes are to cities / towns like Tirunelveli, Virudhunagar, Madurai, Tuticorin, Nagercoil, Tenkasi, Rajapalayam, Aryankavu Srivilliputhur, Sivakasi, Surandai, Kalugumalai, Thiruvenkatam, Valliyur, Courtallam, Shencottah, Theni, Kumili, Papanasam, Tirunelveli, Ambasamudram, Kanyakumari, Tiruchendur, Rameshwaram, Tirumangalam, Aruppukottai, Kovilpatti, Sivagiri, Kayathar, Sattur, Nanguneri, Ettaiyapuram, Karivalamvandha Nallur and so on. Sankarankovil has state transport (SETC) bus routes to Ooty, Munnar, Madurai, Chennai, Coimbatore, Trichy, Palakkad, Calicut, Dindigul, Hosur and so on.

=== Rail ===
The Sankarankovil Railway Station (Code: SNKL) is a major railhead in Tenkasi district. All the trains running in Virudhunagar - Sengottai line makes a halt at this station.

A Daily Thrice Passenger train that runs between Madurai and Sengottai on both directions makes a technical halt at Sankarankovil.

Expresses and superfast expresses including Pothigai Super fast express, Kollam Express Connects Sankarankovil to Chennai Egmore via Virudhunagar, Madurai, Dindigul, Tiruchirapalli, Villupuram.

Silambu Super fast Express from Sengottai also connects Chennai Egmore but via different route. Via Virudhunagar, Manamadurai, Karaikudi, Tiruchirapalli.

== Municipality ==
Sankarankovil includes many localities, including Gomathi Nagar, Gomathiyapuram Nagar, Ramasamiapuram, Sangupuram Nagar, Lakshmiyapuram Nagar, Vadukkupudhur, Therkku Sankarankovil, NGO Colony, Avrmv Colony, Agasthiyar Nagar, Ezhil Nagar, and Mullai Nagar.

== Sankarankovil RTO ==
Sankarankovil RTO was opened by chief minister Ms. J. Jayalalithaa via video conference.

== Notable people from Sankarankovil ==
- Devaneya Pavanar (Tamil writer)
- Vaiko (founder of MDMK)
- Karuppasamy (minister in ADMK government, up to 22 October 2011)
- S. Thangavelu (ex state minister, member of parliament (R.S.) [D.M.K]
- Vivek (Actor)
- S. J. Surya (Actor)
