= Surandai =

Surandai Rajasooriyanallur, Suranthai
- Town
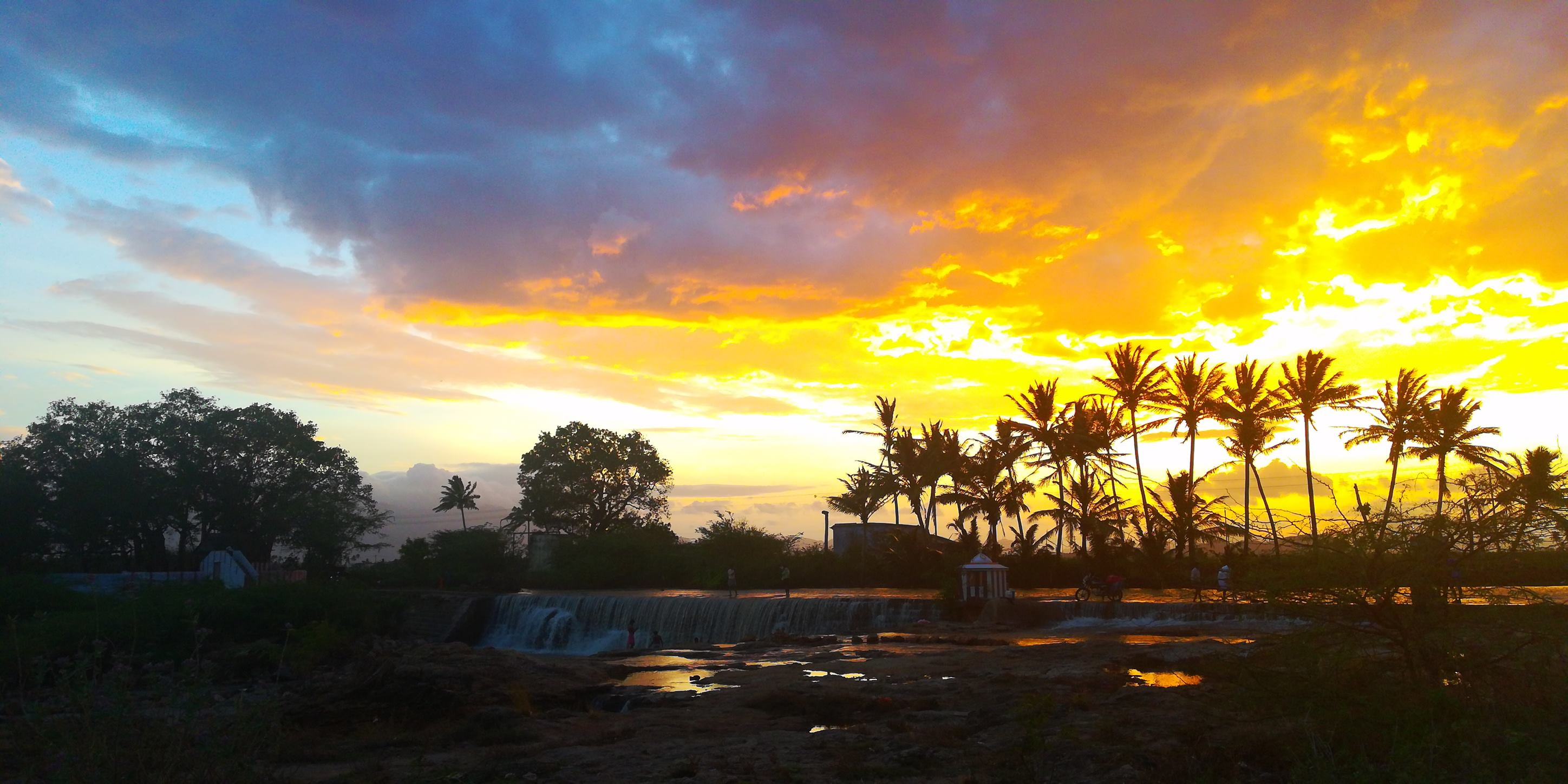
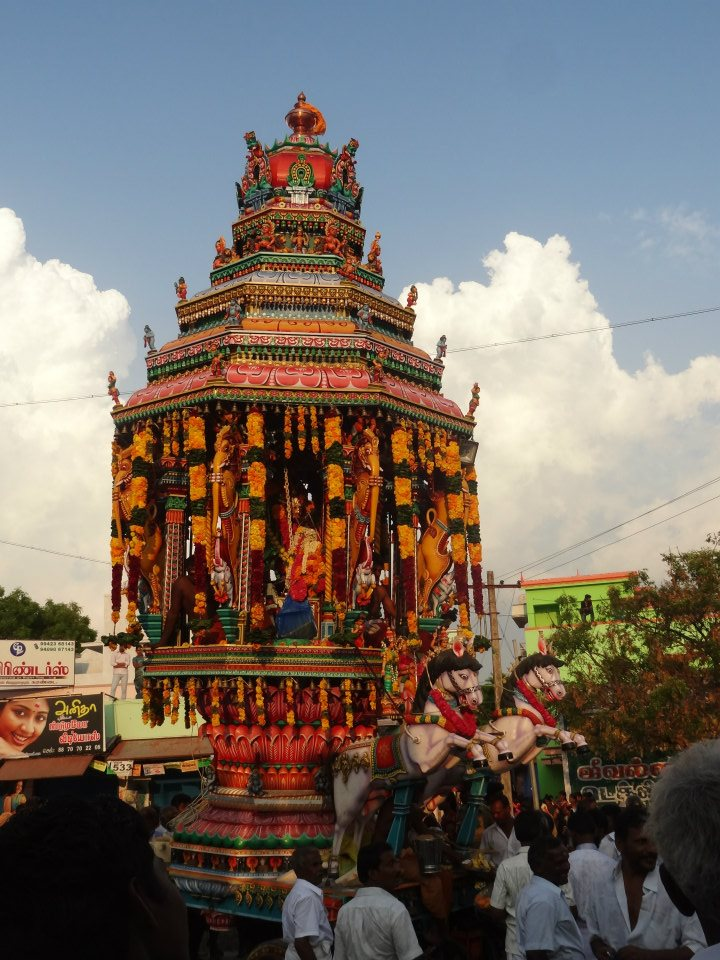
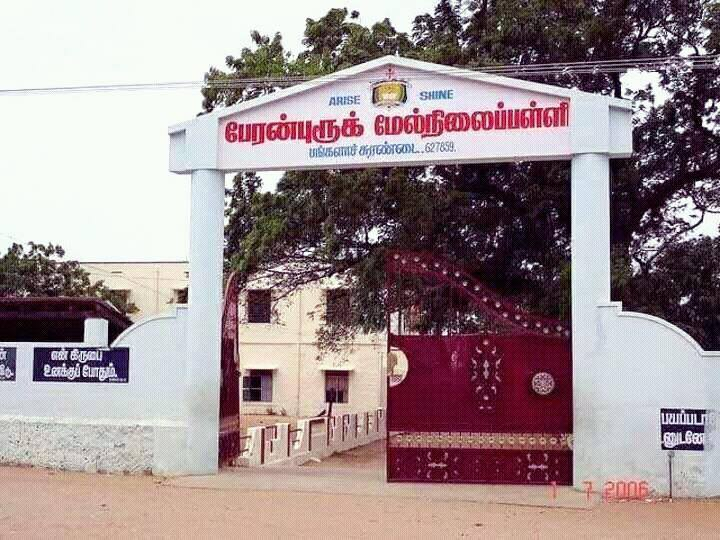
- From top, left to right: Muppidathi Amman Temple, Baren Bruck School

- Location in Tamil Nadu, India
- Coordinates: 8.977272°N 77.420568°E
- Country: India
- State: Tamil Nadu
- District: Tenkasi district

Government
  - Type: Municipality
  - Body: Surandai Municipality
- Elevation: 132 m (433 ft)

Population (2011)
  - Total: 35,272

Languages
  - Official: Tamil
- Time zone: UTC+5:30 (IST)
- PINCODE: 627859
- Telephone code: 04633
- Vehicle registration: TN76

Surandai is a Town in the Tenkasi district, of Tamil Nadu, India.

== History ==
Surandai Palayam was formed during the reign of Madurai Nayagam Khansagi. It was changed to jameen during the British rule. Surandai was formed by amalgamation of villages of Lower Surandai, Bangla Surandai and Surandai. This town, which used to be a village, was upgraded to a Town Panchayat in the 1980s. Surandai was upgraded to a municipality on 24 August 2021 after the creation of Tenkasi district in India.

Earlier "Surandai" was known as "Raja Sooriya Nallur" then it becomes "Suranthai". For the past 50 years, the town name is Surandai.

== Palayakarar rule and the revolts ==
As the Dalavay Mudali, the governor of Tirunelveli, became increasingly independent of Madurai during the time of troubles that began in 1732, some of the Maravarkings of the province openly defied the Dalavay's authority and stopped paying tribute. king Kattari Velladurai was the leader of the defiant king from Vadagarai, Nerkattumseval ruled by Puli Thevar and Sivagiri. Surandai was one of the palayams that joined Puli Thevar’s coalition in 1754–1762 but abandoned the cause before the king’ final defeat in 1762. When Kollamkondan again rebelled in 1764, following the execution of Yusuf Khan for having betrayed the nawab, Surandai was quick to join. Victories over the Anglo-Nawabi forces helped the revolt spread to other kings. At the end of the First king War in 1799, the king of Surandai surrendered one fort and 61 armed men to Major J. Bannerman.

== Zamindar ==
The Palaiyam survived into the 19th century as a zamindari; at the time of the permanent settlement of 1802, Palayakarar Sivagurunatha Sulava Pandiya Thevar held seven villages. In 1879, the zamindari had an area of 1.34 sq. miles, and a population of 2,580; it was bought by Uthumalai and annexed to that estate in 1874.

== Geography ==
Surandai is located at 8.977272°N 77.420568°E. It has an average elevation of 132 metres (433 feet). It is situated 20 km from Coutrallam Falls, 12 km away from Tenkasi and 50 km from Tirunelveli, District Head. It is 30 km away from Sankarankovil. The nearest railway station is Tenkasi and the nearest airport is Tuticorin(Thoothukudi), 86 km from Surandai. Surandai panchayat town comprised Surandai and Keelasurandai, Anai kulam, Kurungavanam, Kulayaneri, Kadayalurutti, Aladipatti, Kurichanpatti, Vadiur, Karayalanoor, Mariathaipuram, Paranguntrapuram, Kalingapatti, Achankundram, Bangalow Surandai and part of Ammaiyapuram. Surandai, which was once a village with primarily agricultural and palm tree cultivation with allied activities, presently has grown into a bustling centre for complete trade and business for nearby Panchayats.

== Demographics ==
As of 2011India census, Surandai Panchayat had a population of 35272. Males constitute 50% of the population and females 50%. Surandai has an average literacy rate of 65%, higher than the national average of 59.5%: male literacy is 73%, and female literacy is 57%. In Surandai, 12% of the population is under 6 years of age.

== Municipal administration and politics ==
Surandai municipality established in 2021 initially it was a Town panchayat and upgraded as municipality
