= Tenkasi =

- City
- Tenkasi
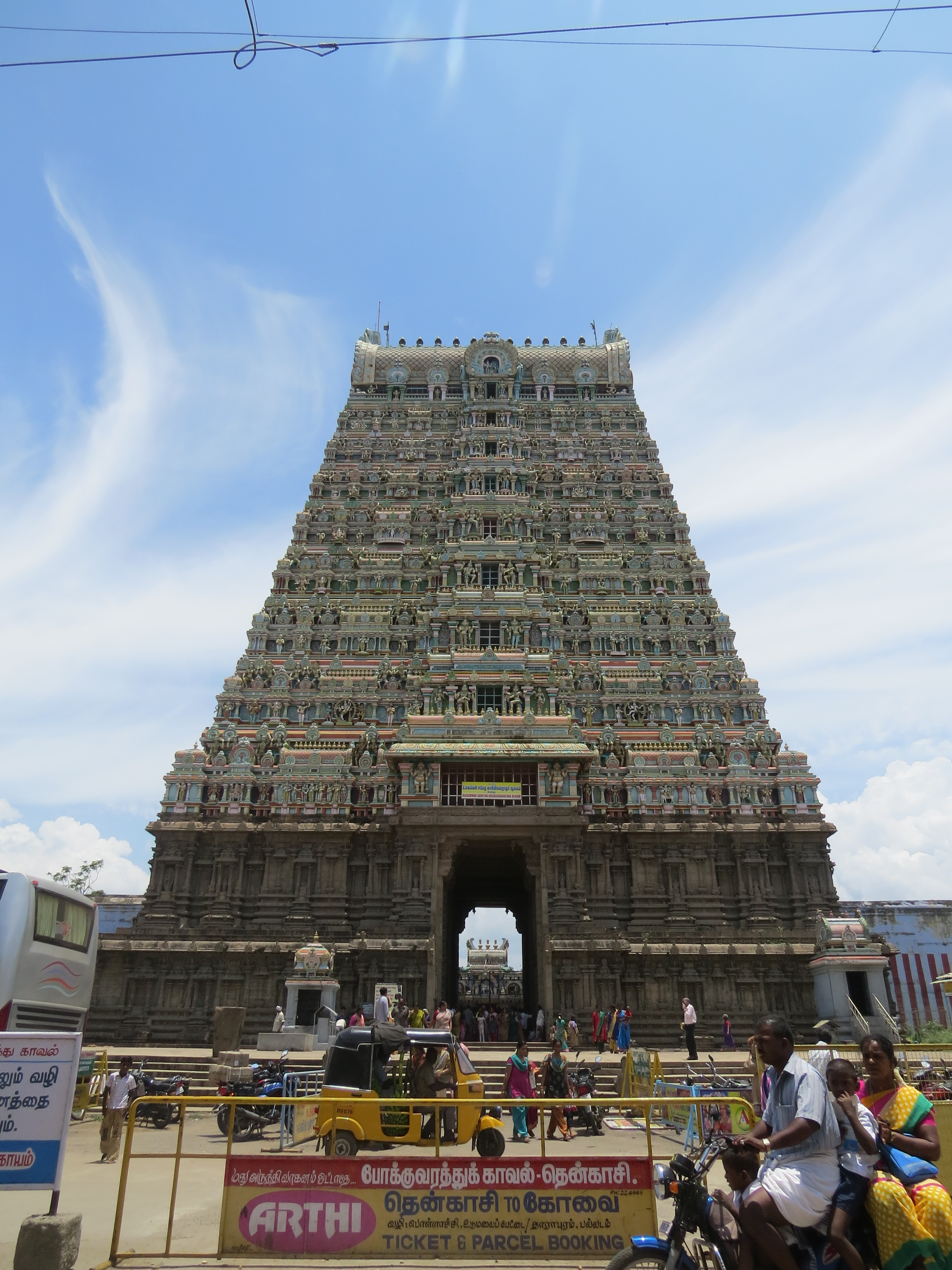
- Kasi Viswanathar Temple, the most prominent landmark in the town

- Tenkasi (Tamil Nadu) Tenkasi (India)
- Coordinates: 8.956400°N 77.315200°E
- Country: India
- State: Tamil Nadu
- Region: Pandya Nadu
- District: Tenkasi
- Founded by: Parakirama Pandian (12th Century AD)

Government
  - Type: Special Grade Municipality
  - Body: Tenkasi Municipality

Area
  - Total: 26 km^{2} (10 sq mi)
  - Rank: 20
- Elevation: 184 m (604 ft)

Population (2011)
  - Total: 70,545
  - Density: 2,700/km^{2} (7,000/sq mi)

Languages
  - Official: Tamil
- Time zone: UTC+5:30 (IST)
- PIN: 627811.
- Vehicle registration: TN-76 , TN-79

Tenkasi (Tamil: [t̪eŋɡaːsi]) is a city and the headquarters of the Tenkasi district in the Indian state of Tamil Nadu.

== Etymology ==
In the Tamil language, Tenkasi means south Kashi (Thenk+Kashi). As the name indicates, Tenkasi is situated in southern India and is home to the Tenkasi Viswanathar Temple.

== Demographics ==
Religious census
Religion	Percent(%)
Hindu	63.99%
Muslim	34.19%
Christian	1.7%
Sikh	0.01%
Buddhist	0.01%
Other	0.1%

According to the 2011 census, Tenkasi had a population of 70,545 with a sex-ratio of 1,020 females for every 1,000 males, much above the national average of 929. A total of 7,413 were under the age of six, constituting 3,774 males and 3,639 females. Scheduled Castes and Scheduled Tribes accounted for 14.16% and 0.47% of the population respectively. The average literacy of the town was 78.49%, compared to the national average of 72.99%. The town had a total of 17,887 households. There were a total of 27,885 workers, comprising 279 cultivators, 2,006 main agricultural labourers, 3,332 in household industries, 19,903 other workers, 2,365 marginal workers, 28 marginal cultivators, 90 marginal agricultural labourers, 494 marginal workers in household industries and 1,753 other marginal workers.

As per the religious census of 2011, Tenkasi was 64% Hindu, 34.18% Muslim, and 2.7% Christian.

== History ==
The Kasi Viswanathar Temple was built in 1467 AD by Parakirama Pandian. Tenkasi is the last capital of the Pandya dynasty. The iconic temple is situated in the banks of Seevalaperi Pond.

== Geography ==
Tenkasi is located at 8.97°N 77.3°E. It has an average elevation of 143 metres (469 ft). The town is surrounded by the Western Ghats on three sides and lies on the Tirunelveli to Kollam and Madurai to Kollam highways. The Chittar River flows through the city.

Climate data for Tenkasi, Tamil Nadu
Month	Jan	Feb	Mar	Apr	May	Jun	Jul	Aug	Sep	Oct	Nov	Dec	Year
Mean daily maximum °C (°F)	29.7 (85.5)	31.3 (88.3)	33.0 (91.4)	33.2 (91.8)	33.4 (92.1)	31.7 (89.1)	30.9 (87.6)	31.3 (88.3)	31.6 (88.9)	30.8 (87.4)	29.3 (84.7)	29.2 (84.6)	31.3 (88.3)
Mean daily minimum °C (°F)	21.6 (70.9)	22.3 (72.1)	23.8 (74.8)	25.0 (77.0)	25.5 (77.9)	24.6 (76.3)	24.2 (75.6)	24.3 (75.7)	24.0 (75.2)	23.7 (74.7)	22.8 (73.0)	21.9 (71.4)	23.6 (74.6)
Average precipitation mm (inches)	48 (1.9)	37 (1.5)	67 (2.6)	97 (3.8)	76 (3.0)	120 (4.7)	105 (4.1)	47 (1.9)	57 (2.2)	214 (8.4)	221 (8.7)	105 (4.1)	1,194 (46.9)
Source: Climate-Data.org

== Politics ==
Tenkasi (state assembly constituency) is part of Tenkasi Lok Sabha constituency.

- S. Palani Nadar from INC is the Member of the Legislative Assembly (MLA) from Tenkasi, post the 2021 Tamil Nadu Legislative Assembly election as a part of Secular Progressive Alliance.
- Rani Srikumar from DMK is the Member of Parliament (MP) as a part of the United Progressive Alliance, post the 2024 Indian general election.

== Transportation ==
=== Rail connectivity ===
Tenkasi is served by the Tenkasi Junction railway station using express and passenger trains. Trains are available to Chennai, Madurai, Kollam, Punalur, Shenkottai, Tirunelveli and Palakkad from here daily.

Three broad gauge, single-electric railway lines originate from this station.

- Tenkasi Junction - Kollam Junction line
- Tenkasi Junction - Tirunelveli Junction line
- Tenkasi Junction - Virudunagar Junction line

=== Air connectivity ===
The nearest airports are as follows:-

1. Thoothukudi Airport (91 kilometres or 57 miles)
2. Trivandrum International Airport (114 kilometres or 71 miles)
3. Madurai International Airport (158 kilometres or 98 miles)
4. Tiruchirappalli International Airport (297 kilometres or 185 miles)

== Villages ==
- Kurumbalapperi
- Keelapavoor
