= Vedapureeswarar temple, Thiruverkadu =

Hindu temple of Shiva in Thiruverkadu, India

Vedapureeswarar Temple
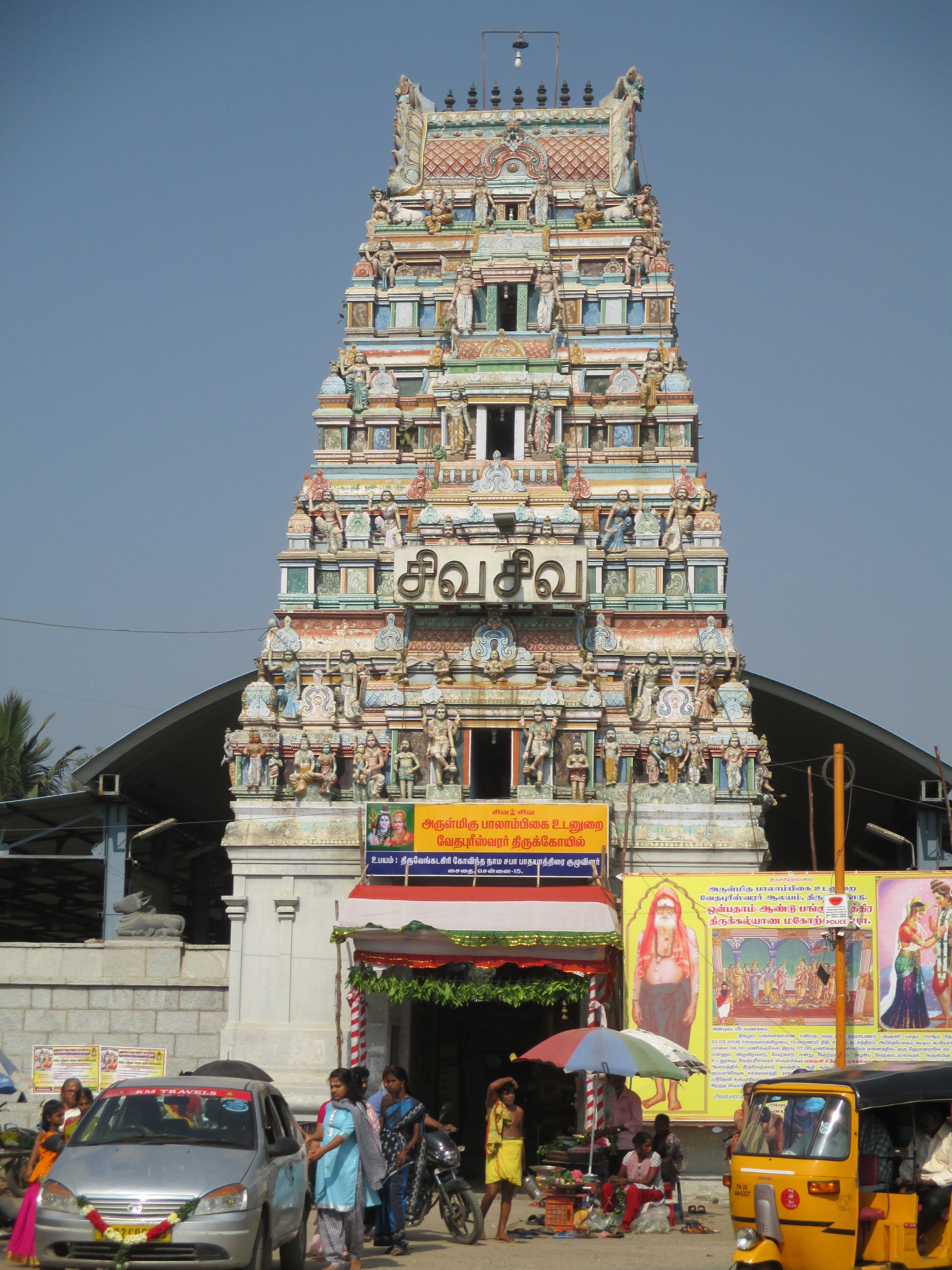
- Gateway tower of the temple

- Location in Tamil Nadu

Religion
- Affiliation: Hinduism
- District: Tiruvallur
- Deity: Vedapureeswarar(Shiva)

Location
- State: Tamil Nadu
- Country: India
- Coordinates: 13°04′17″N 80°06′53″E

Architecture
- Type: Dravidian architecture

Vedapureeswarar Temple or Eswaran Dharmaraja Koil is a Hindu temple dedicated to the deity Shiva, located in Thiruverkadu, a Municipality in Tiruvallur district in the South Indian state of Tamil Nadu. Shiva is worshipped as Vedapureeswarar, and is represented by the lingam. His consort Parvati is depicted as Balambigai. The presiding deity is revered in the 7th century Tamil Saiva canonical work, the Tevaram, written by Tamil saint poets known as the Nayanars and classified as Paadal Petra Sthalam.

The temple complex covers two acres and it houses two gateway towers known as gopurams, each facing the Vedapureeswarar and Balambigai shrine. The temple has a number of shrines, with those of Vedapureeswarar and his consort Balambigai being the most prominent.

The temple has six daily rituals at various times from 6:00 a.m. to 8:30 p.m., and four yearly festivals on its calendar. The Brahmotsavam festival is celebrated during the day of the Magam (February - March) is the most prominent festival.

The original complex is believed to have been built before 7th century CE by the Cholas, the temple was reconstructed in 1973 under the technical direction of G. Yegneswaran with the blessings of Sri Swamiji Ramadoss. In modern times, the temple is maintained and administered by the Hindu Religious and Charitable Endowments Department of the Government of Tamil Nadu.

== Legend ==
As per Hindu legend, during the divine wedding of Shiva and Parvati, there was heavy crowd at Kailash, the abode of Shiva. Sage Agastya could not view event and prayed to Shiva at this place to get him a view of the event. Pleased by his devotion, Shiva appeared to the sage and his wife Lopamudra along with Parvati in his marriage attire. Shiva made the place his abode and appeared in his marriage posture to Agastya. The same legend is associated with Papanasanathar Temple and Agasthiyar Falls. The temple is also believed to be the place from where Shiva's son Murugan (Kartikeya) got his weapon to kill the demon king Surapadma.

== Architecture ==
This temple is situated 27 km from Chennai in Thiruverkadu, a municipality in Tiruvallur district. The nearest railway station is at Avadi and the nearest airport is Chennai International Airport. The Shiva temple at Thiruverkadu is spread over an area of 1.5 acres (6,100 m^{2}). The main rajagopuram, facing the east, is on the eastern side with seven tiers. The temple complex has three corridors (prakaras). The vimana above the sanctum sanctorum is of Gajabrushta design.

The temple tank is located outside the main entrance. The two inner corridors are located inside the temple. At the main entrance, the sculptures of Ganapathy (Ganesha0 and Murugan can be found on both the sides. The main shrine accommodates the image of Shiva known as Vedapureeswarar and Parvati as his consort Balambigai. Like the Shiva temples in Thondai Nadu, the sanctum houses lingam (the aniconic symbol of Shiva) and the images of Shiva and Parvati in wedding posture. There is a separate shrine for Balambigai to the right of Vedapureeswarar's sanctum. The first precinct on the four sides of the sanctum sancotrum are decorated with the images of Nayanars, Murugan in the northwest and Durga on the northeast. The temple has Navagraha, which is sculpted in a lotus pedestal. The temple has a separate shrine for Arunagirinathar and Murkha Nayanar. There is a prominent sculpture of Karumari Amman in the temple.

== Religious importance and festivals ==
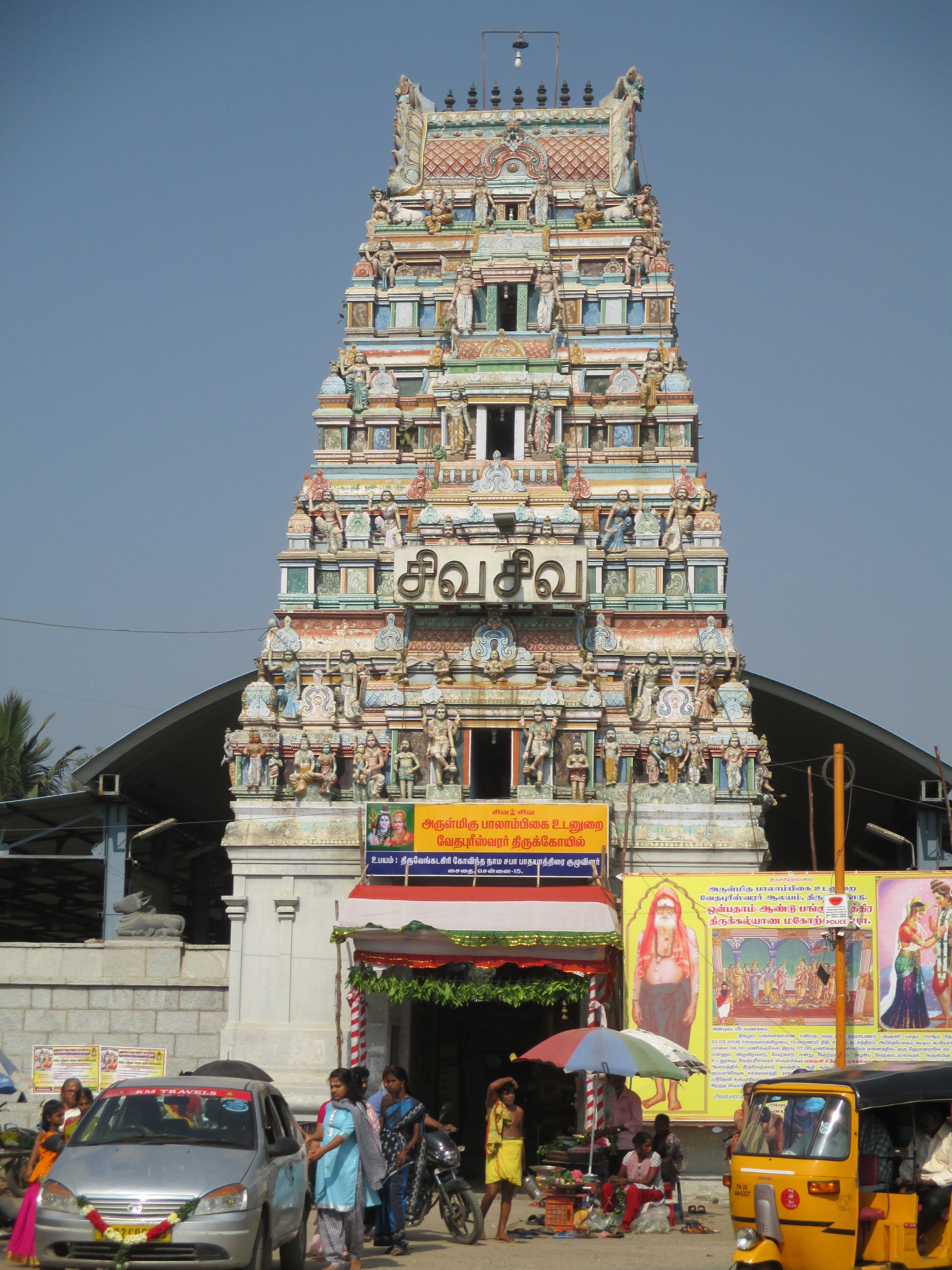
Gateway tower of the temple

It is one of the shrines of the 275 Paadal Petra Sthalams - Shiva Sthalams glorified in the early medieval Tevaram poems by Tamil Saivite Nayanar Sambandar. This is the 23rd Shiva temple in Tondai region praised in Thevaram hymns. The temple also finds mention in Tirumular's Thirumantiram, Arunagirinathar's Tiruppugazh and Manikkavacakar's Tiruvacakam.

== See also ==
- Heritage structures in Chennai
- Religion in Chennai
