= Servalar dam =

Dam in Tamil Nadu, India

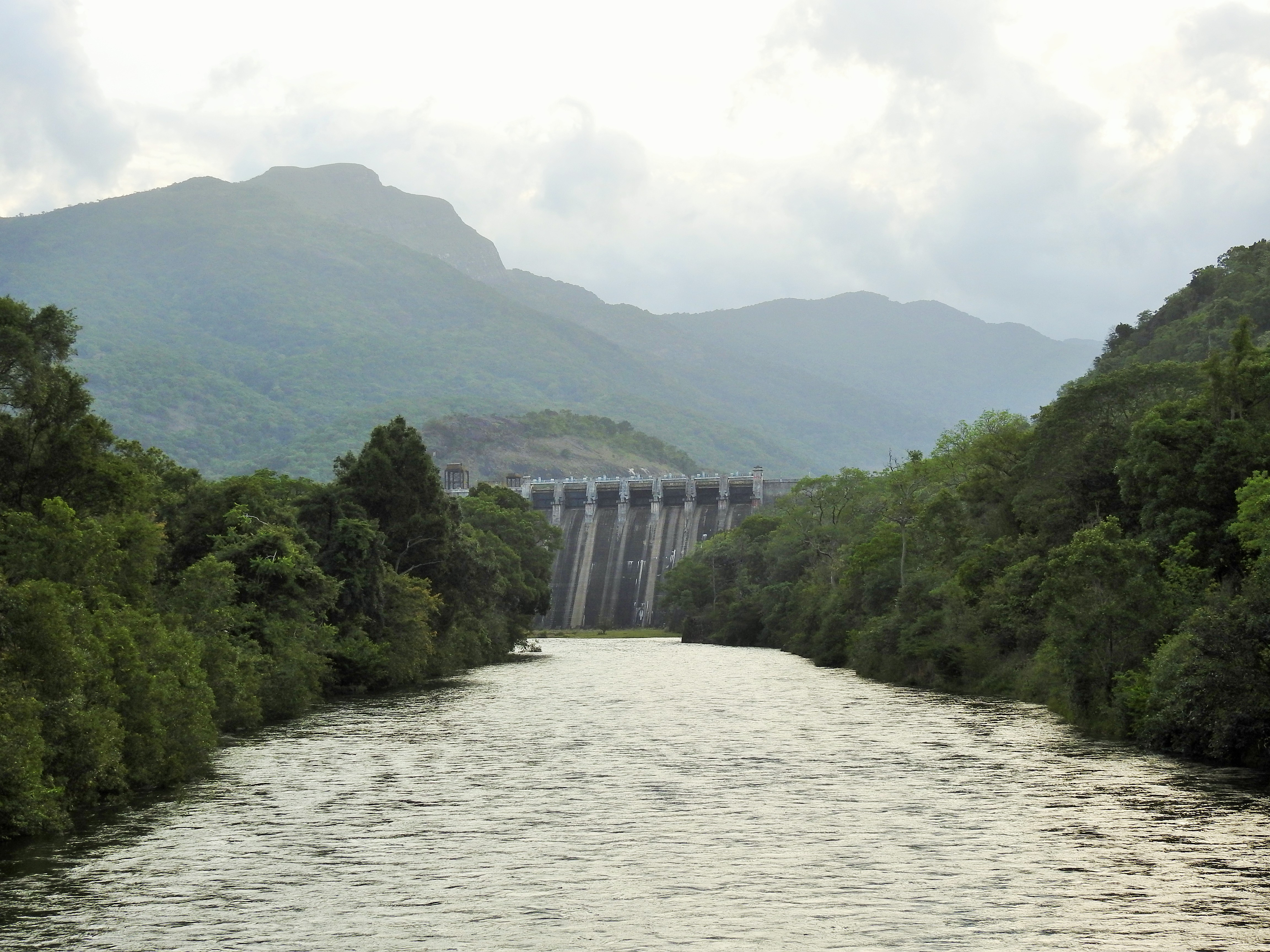
- Servalar Dam at Mundanthurai in 2016

- Location of the Servalar dam in Tamil Nadu
- Country: India
- Location: Papanasam, Tirunelveli District, Tamil Nadu
- Coordinates: 8.690041°N 77.304823°E
- Purpose: Power generation Irrigation
- Opening date: 1986

Dam and spillways
- Type of dam: Gravity dam
- Height: 156 ft (48 m)
- Height (foundation): 175.20 ft (53 m)
- Length: 1,525.59 ft (465 m)

Reservoir
- Creates: Servalar reservoir
- Total capacity: 1.22×10^{9} cu ft (28,007 acre⋅ft) (1.22 tmc ft)

Power Station
- Operator: TNEB
- Commission date: Unit 1: 23 March 1986
- Turbines: 1 x 20 MW
- Installed capacity: 20 MW

The Servalar Dam was set up for power generation in 1986, with a capacity of 1225 million cubic feet. The peak water level of the dam is 156 ft. The water drained out of the dam's power plant is again stored in Papanasam Dam for irrigation.
