= Murkha Nayanar =

32nd Nayanar saint

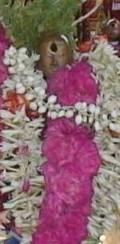

Personal life
- Born: Tiruverkadu
- Honors: Nayanar saint,

Religious life
- Religion: Hinduism
- Philosophy: Shaivism, Bhakti

Murkha Nayanar, also known as Moorka Nayanar, Murka Nayanar, Moorkha Nayanar, Murgga Nayanar, Moorkka Nayanar and Murkhar, is a Nayanar saint, venerated in the Hindu sect of Shaivism. He is generally counted as the thirty-second in the list of 63 Nayanars.

== Life ==
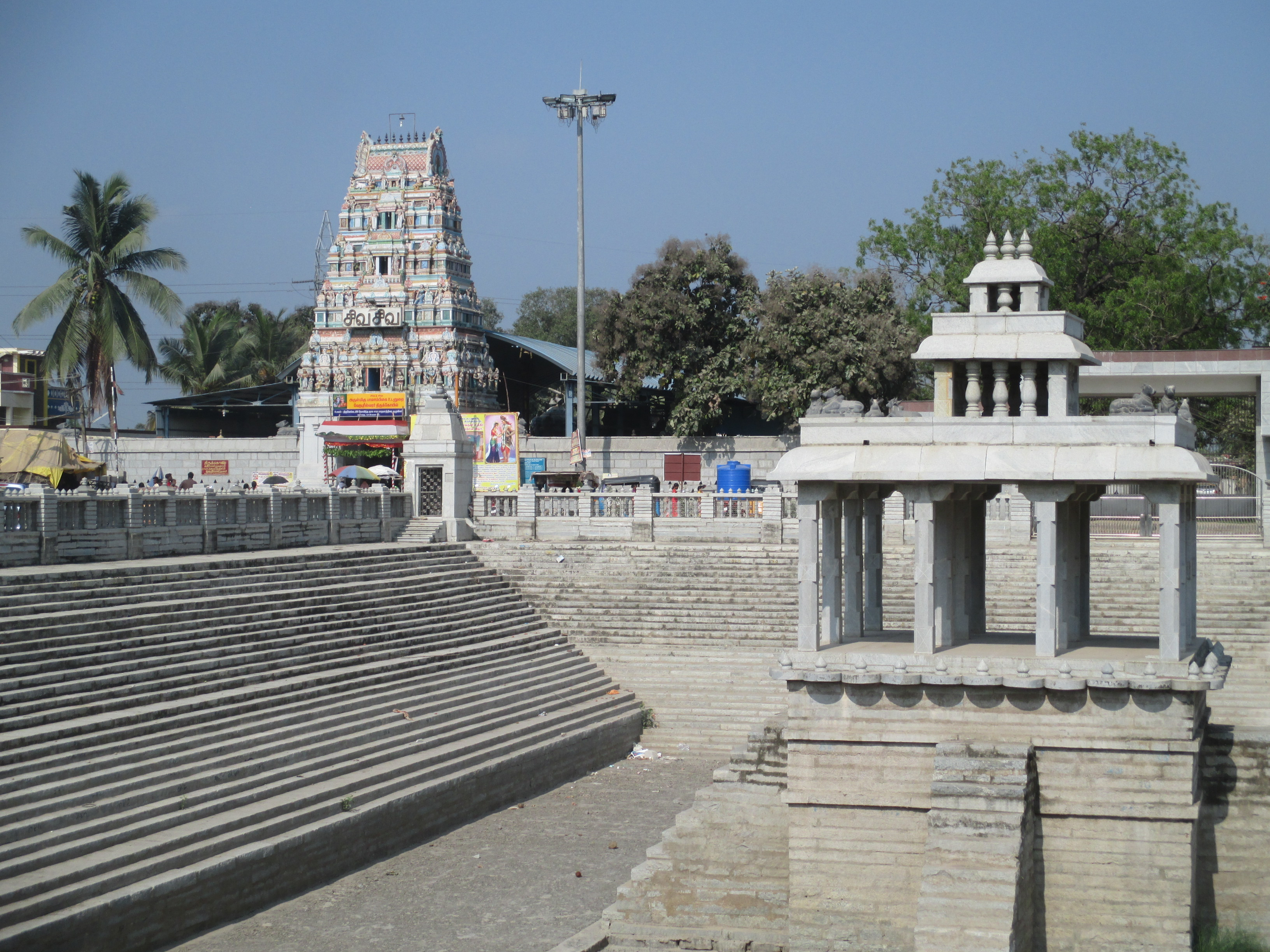
Vedapureeswarar Temple, Thiruverkadu where there is a shrine of Murkha Nayanar

The life of Murkha Nayanar is described in the Periya Puranam by Sekkizhar (12th century), which is a hagiography of the 63 Nayanars.

Murkha was born in Tiruverkadu (Thiruverkadu), which was part of Tondai Nadu, then part of the Pallava kingdom. Tiruverkadu is currently a western suburb of the Indian city of Chennai. He is described as great devotee of the god Shiva, the patron god of Shaivism. Murkha Nayanar cultivated devotion for Shiva from his childhood. He used to serve Shiva, by serving Shaivas, the devotees of Shiva. He used to prepare rice with ghee and various sweet and savoury delicacies and feed the devotees. The saint spent all his wealth in feeding the devotees. He sold all his possessions, including his properties and his slaves.

To gain wealth and feed the devotees, Murkha turned to gambling and mastered "the art". Since people of Tiruverkadu did not want to gamble, he travelled to various towns, gambling and spending the money in serving Shiva and his devotees. He finally reached Tirukkudanthai (present-day Kumbakonam), home of numerous Shiva temples. To serve a feast to the devotees, he went to the gambling houses of the town. He strategically lost money in the initial rounds, forcing the opponents to gamble more money in the later rounds, winning great amount of money. He used to stab rivals, who cheated or used deception to win or refused to pay after losing. His actions earned him the name Murkha Nayanar, translated variously as "wicked Nayanar", "fierce Nayanar" and "violent Nayanar". The money was given to cooks, to prepare a feast for the devotees. He used to eat only after all the devotees had eaten. He lived his life, gambling and serving devotees, finally reaching Kailash - Shiva's abode, after his death.

== Remembrance ==
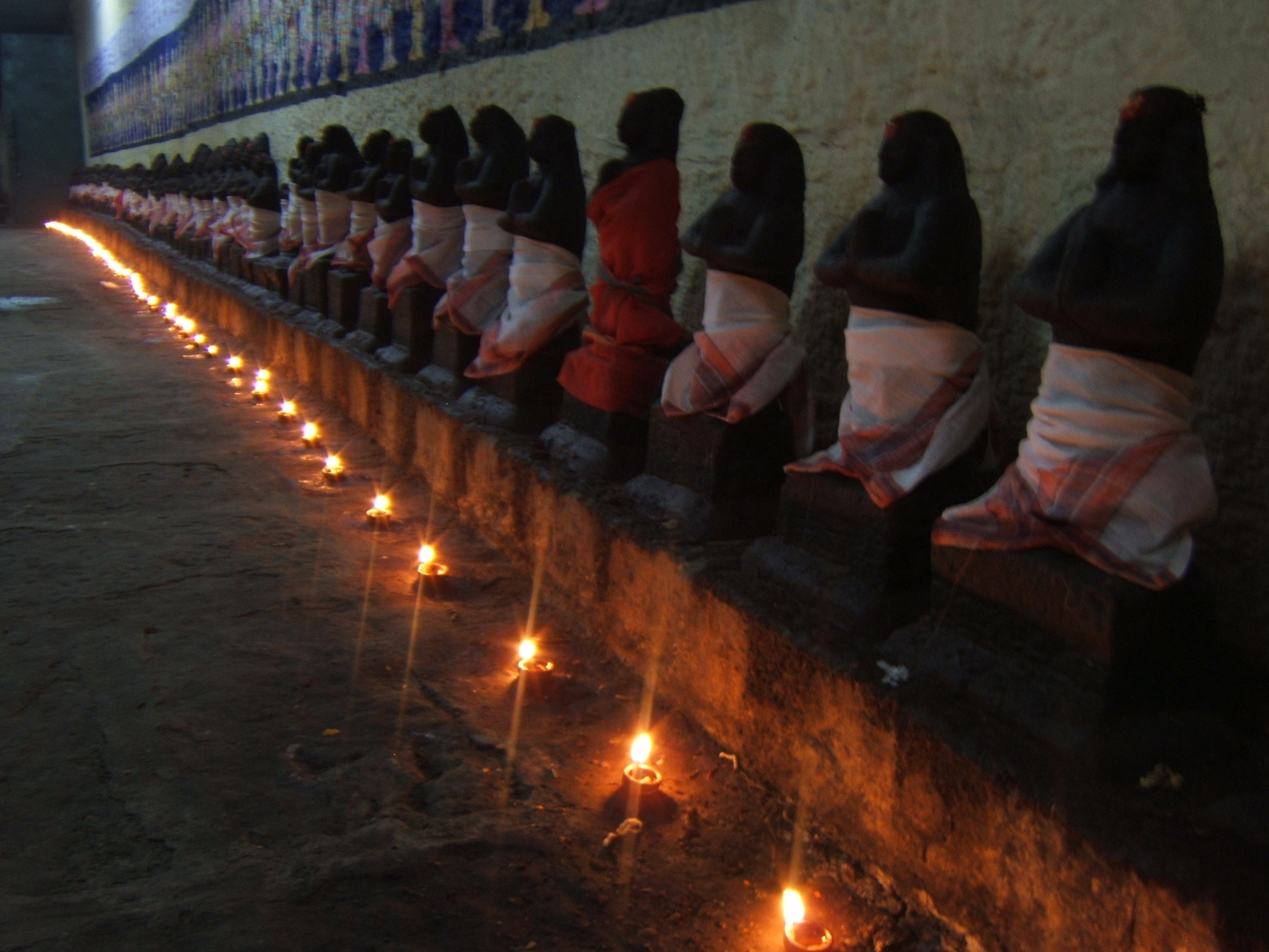
The images of the Nayanars are found in many Shiva temples in Tamil Nadu.

Murkha Nayanar is depicted with folded hands (see Anjali mudra). A holy day in his honour is observed in the Tamil month of Karthikai (November–December). One of the most prominent Nayanars, Sundarar (7th century) refers to him as Murkkan (Murkha Nayanar) in a hymn to Nayanar saints. In another hymn to Shiva, he praises Shiva who accepts of the "skillful gambler" (karra cutan), a reference to Murkha Nayanar.

A shrine is dedicated to Murkha Nayanar in the outer corridor of the Vedapureeswarar Temple, the Shiva temple in his home-town Tiruverkadu. A festival is celebrated in his honour in the month of Karthikai when the moon moves into the Nakshatra (Lunar mansion) of Krittika.

Murkha Nayanar is worshipped in the Tamil month of Karthikai, when the moon enters the Mula nakshatra (lunar mansion). He receives collective worship as part of the 63 Nayanars. Their icons and brief accounts of his deeds are found in many Shiva temples in Tamil Nadu. Their images are taken out in procession in festivals.
