= Karumariamman Temple =

May mean:

- Karumariamman Temple, Tiruverkadu, Chennai
- Karumariamman Temple, Penang, Malaysia
- Karumariamman Temple, Jalan Sentul, KL
- Karumariamman temple, Ragavendra
- Karumariamman Temple Jalan Baru
