= Papanasam, Tirunelveli =

Papanasam Pavanasam
- Village
- Location in Tamil Nadu, India
- Coordinates: 8.712°N 77.393°E
- Country: India
- State: Tamil Nadu
- District: Tirunelveli

Languages
  - Official: Tamil
- Time zone: UTC+5:30 (IST)
- PIN: 627425
- Vehicle registration: TN-72

Papanasam also spelt as Pavanasam is a famous picnic spot in Tirunelveli district in the Indian state of Tamil Nadu. It falls under the Ambasamudram Taluk. It is situated 60 kilometres (37 mi) from Tirunelveli. The site features tourist attractions like Thamirabarani River, Agasthiyar Falls, Siva Temple, and Papanasam dam and hydroelectric power plant.

== Neighbouring towns ==
Vikramasingapuram and Ambasamudram are the nearby towns. It falls under Tirunelveli District.

== Geography ==
It is situated at the bank of Thamirabarani river. It is called Thamirabarani since copper (thamiram in Tamil) content in the water is high.

== Climate ==
Climate data for Papanasam
Month	Jan	Feb	Mar	Apr	May	Jun	Jul	Aug	Sep	Oct	Nov	Dec	Year
Mean daily maximum °C (°F)	30 (86)	31.5 (88.7)	33.2 (91.8)	33.5 (92.3)	33.7 (92.7)	32.2 (90.0)	31.3 (88.3)	31.7 (89.1)	32.1 (89.8)	31.2 (88.2)	29.6 (85.3)	29.4 (84.9)	31.6 (88.9)
Daily mean °C (°F)	26.1 (79.0)	27.1 (80.8)	28.6 (83.5)	29.4 (84.9)	29.8 (85.6)	28.7 (83.7)	28 (82)	28.2 (82.8)	28.3 (82.9)	27.7 (81.9)	26.4 (79.5)	25.9 (78.6)	27.9 (82.1)
Mean daily minimum °C (°F)	22.2 (72.0)	22.7 (72.9)	24.4 (75.9)	25.4 (77.7)	26 (79)	25.2 (77.4)	24.8 (76.6)	24.8 (76.6)	24.6 (76.3)	24.2 (75.6)	23.3 (73.9)	22.4 (72.3)	24.2 (75.5)
Average precipitation mm (inches)	37 (1.5)	30 (1.2)	49 (1.9)	88 (3.5)	82 (3.2)	101 (4.0)	79 (3.1)	47 (1.9)	63 (2.5)	202 (8.0)	204 (8.0)	93 (3.7)	1,075 (42.5)
Source: Climate-Data.org (altitude: 76m)

== Occupation ==
The town is surrounded by green paddy fields. It is well known for Madura coats, a fabric production company. This town is also well known for its schools. There are about 108 herbs available in the Papanasam hill area which are not found in other part of the world.

== Tourist attractions ==
Manjolai Hills

Located between elevations ranging from 1,000 to 1,500 metres, the Manjolai area is set deep within the Western Ghats within the Kalakad Mundanthurai Tiger Reserve in the Tirunelveli District. Located on top of the Manimuthar dam and the Manimuthar waterfalls, the Manjolai area comprises tea plantations, small settlements around the tea plantations, upper Kodaiyar dam and a windy viewpoint called Kuthiravetti.

The tea plantations and the whole of Manjolai Estates are tea operated by the Bombay Burmah Trading Corporation Ltd on forest lands leased by the government of Tamil Nadu. There are three tea estates within the Manjolai area—Manjolai Estate, Manimutharu Estate and Oothu Estate. The estates are located on elevations ranging between 2,300 ft. to 4,200 ft. The estates, road and the settlements in the Manjolai area are managed by the Bombay Burmah Trading Corporation Ltd.

- Papanasam River (2 km from Vikramasingapuram)
- Agasthiar Falls
- Vaana Theertham Falls
- Papanasam dam
- Papanasam (upper) Kaarayaar dam
- Servalar dam
- Manimutthaar dam
- ThaiCines—The district's largest movie hall, capable of 1,830 viewers (thaai means 'mother')
- Kalakkad Mundanthurai Tiger Reserve

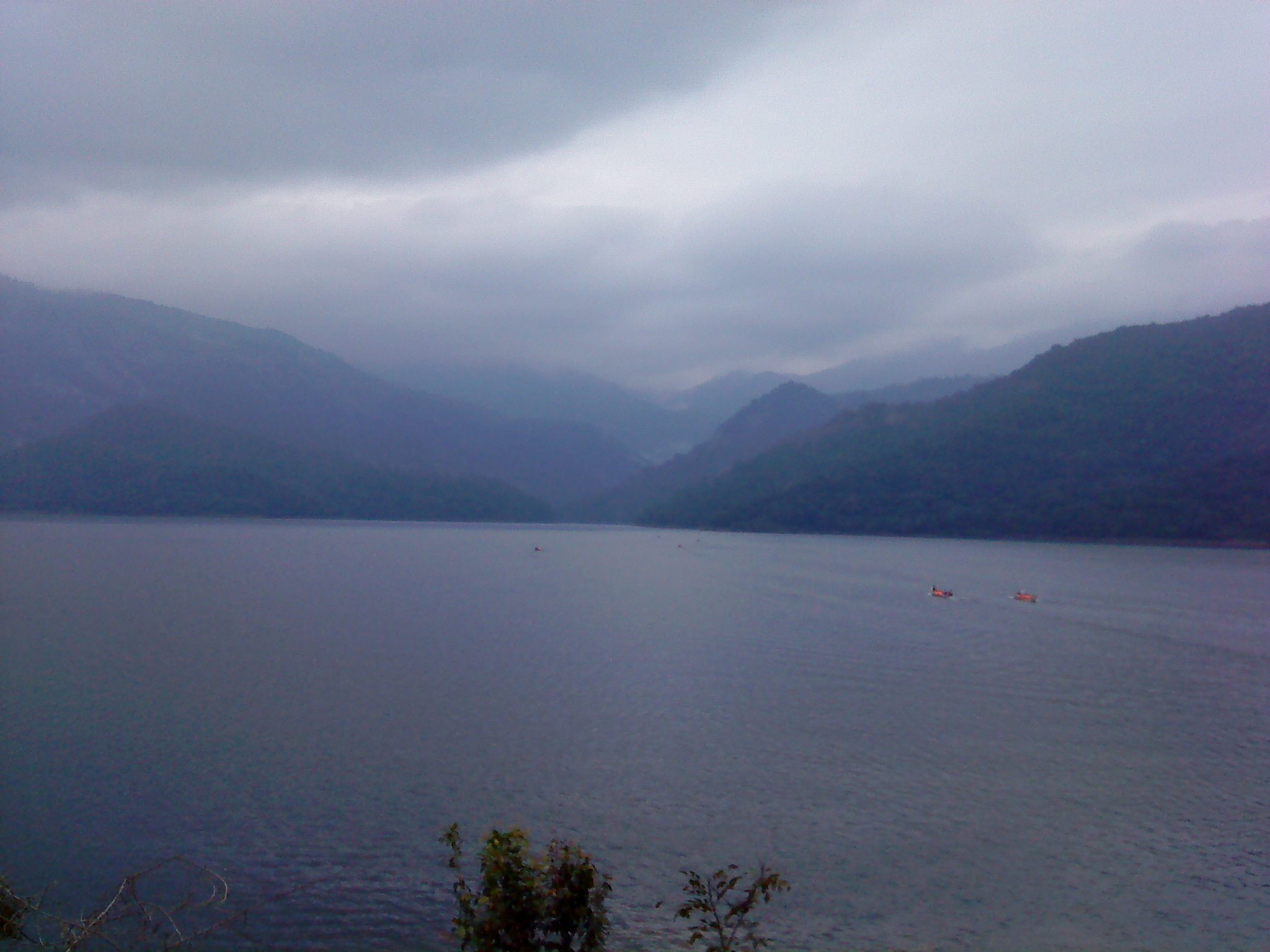
Long view of Karayar Dam, Papanasam, Tirunelveli

== Tourism ==
The Papanasanathar Temple lies on the banks of Thambaraparani river where the main deity is Lord Shiva in the name of Papanasar (destroyer of sins, பாவங்களை அழிக்கும் இடம்). The name of the goddess is Lord Loganayaki, who is also known as Ulagambigai.

The Maha Puskaram Festival which occurs once every 144 years, was inaugurated by the Tamil Nadu governor on 10 October 2018 by taking a holy bath in the Tamiraparani river, opposite the Sivan Temple, and continued until 21 October 2018.

== College ==
Thiruvalluvar arts college is famous in this area.

== Gallery ==
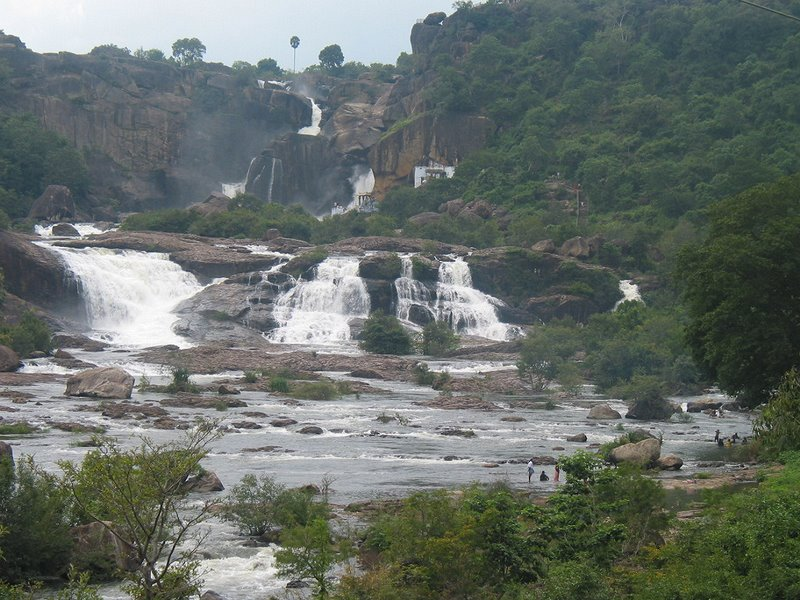
Agasthiar falls (Kalyani theertham)

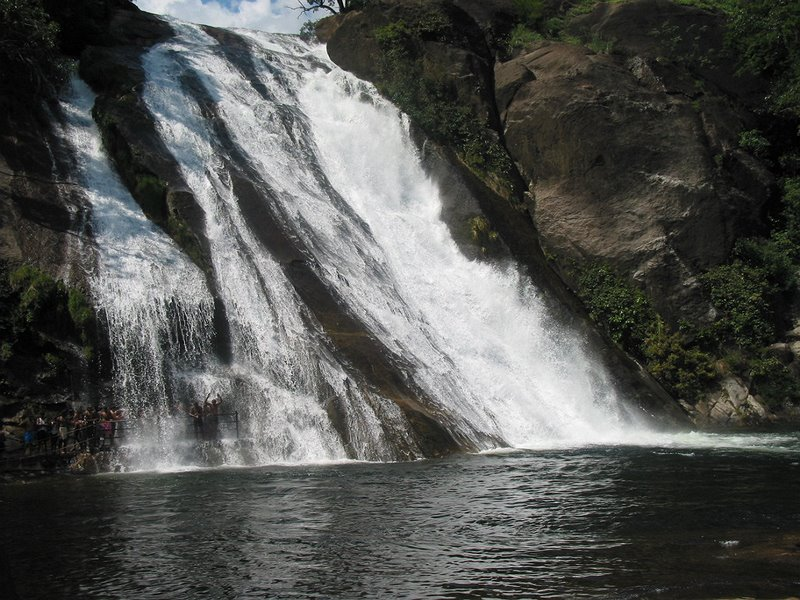
Vaana theertham falls (which flows into the Karayar dam)

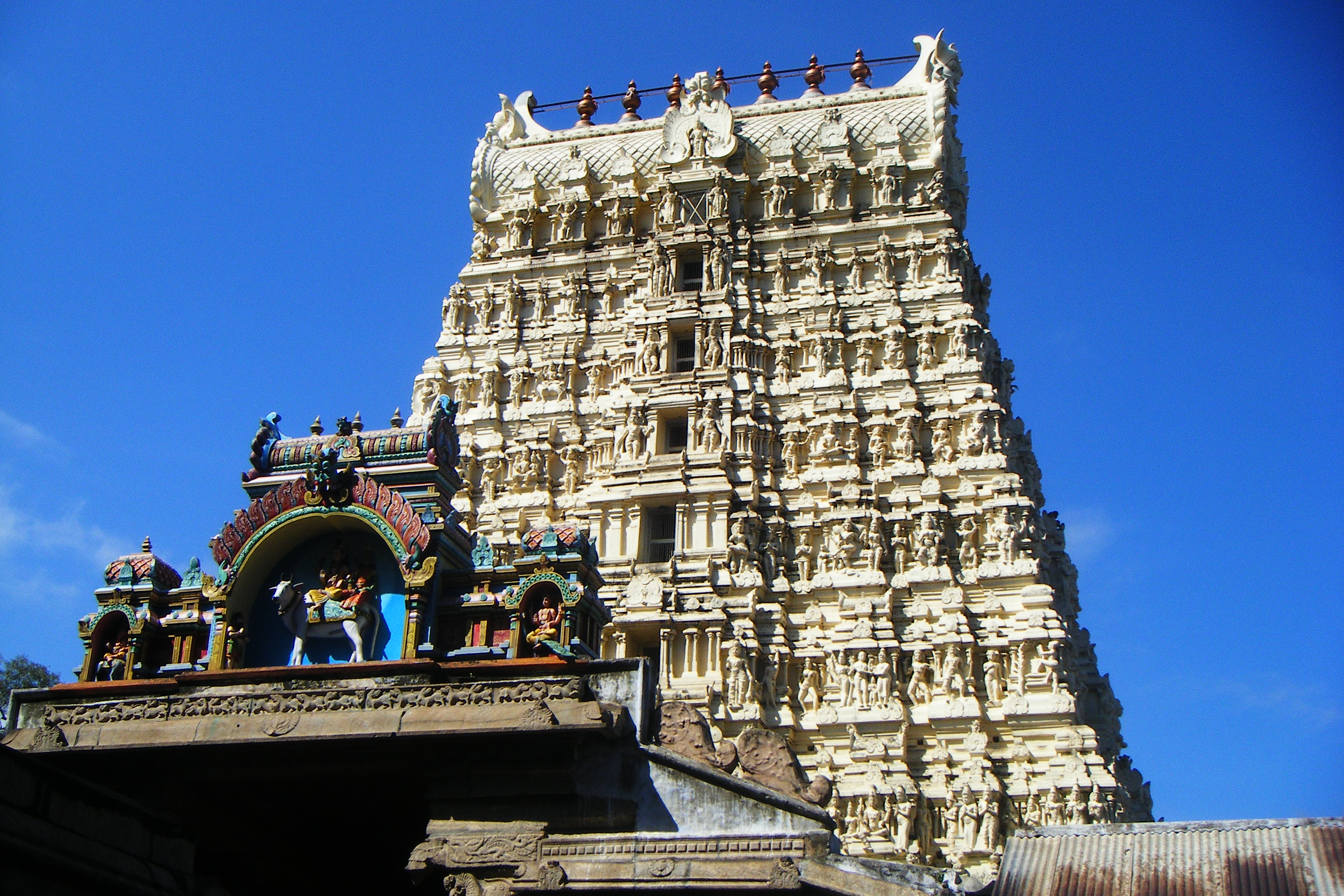
Papanasam temple (November 2007)

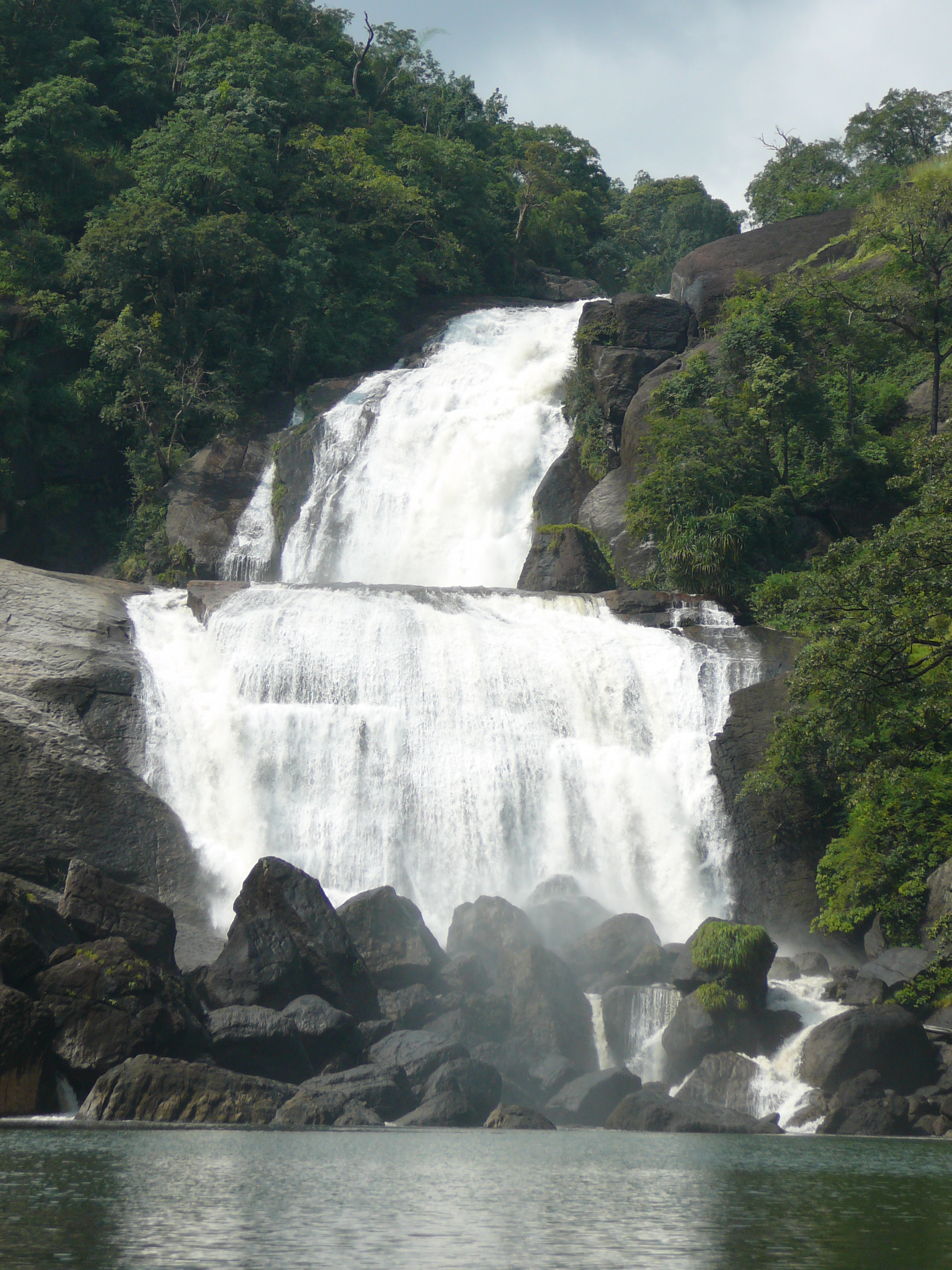
Vaana theertham falls (November 2007)
