= Karumariamman =

Hindu goddess of smallpox, health and cure

- Rain, smallpox, and health<hr / Thiruverkadu
- Member of forms of Mariamman
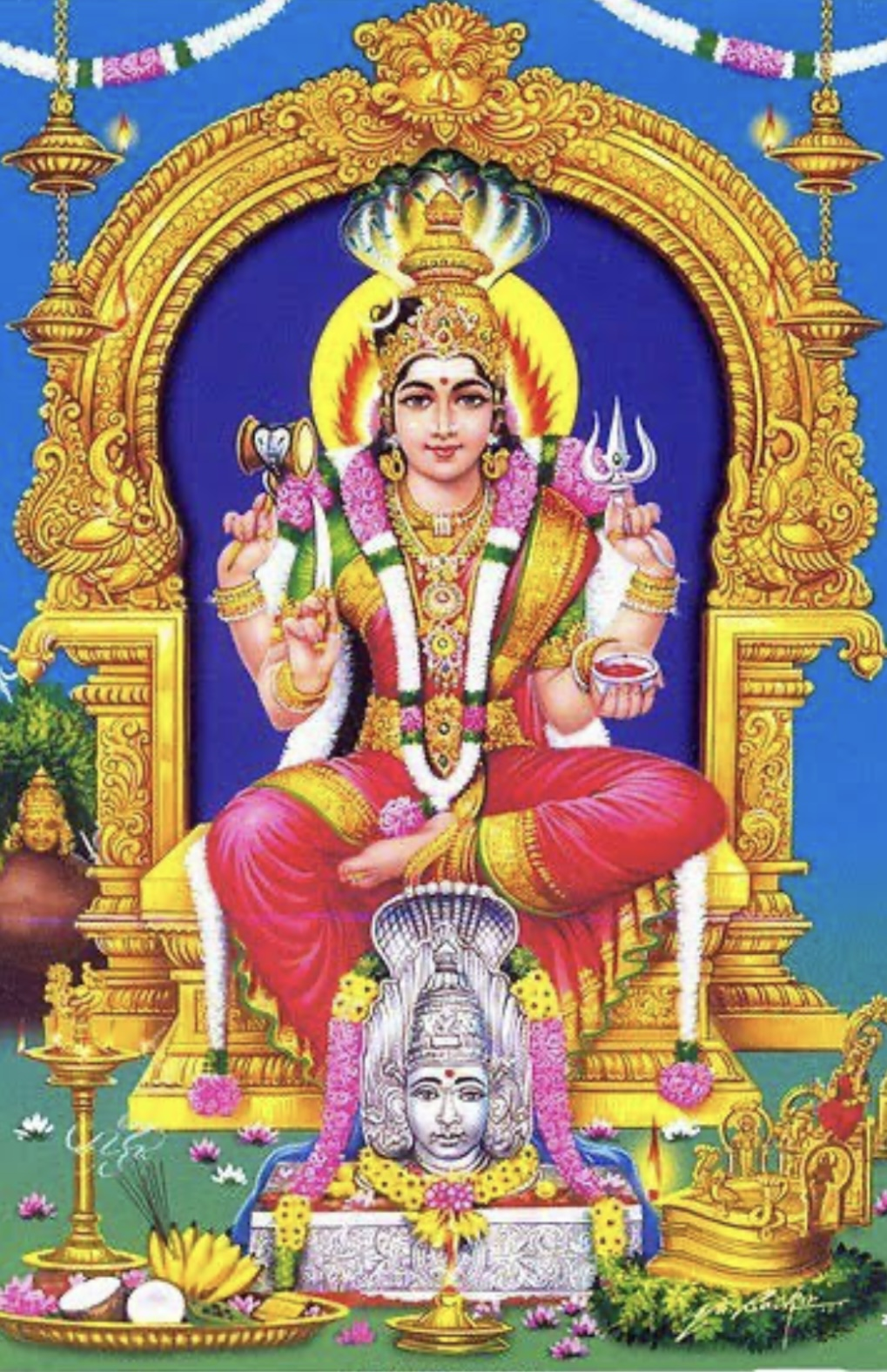
- Image of Karumariamman
- Other names: Karumari, Adi Parashakti, Renuka, Mariyamman, Renukambal, Bramarambha, Mariamma, Ambigai, Jaganmatha, Sarveshwari, Thiruverkadu Amman, Eswari, Mariamman
- Affiliation: Devi, Mariamman
- Abode: Thiruverkadu
- Weapon: Trishula, Khadga, Kapala and Damaru
- Symbols: Neem, Trishula, knife, cobra
- Day: Sunday
- Mount: Lion
- Temples: Karumariamman Temple, Tiruverkadu
- Festivals: Navaratri, Ādi Thiruviḻa, Panguni

Equivalents
- Other: Shitala Renuka Mariamman
- Kannada: Marikambe

Karumariamman (Tamil: கருமாரியம்மன், romanized: Karumāriamman), also known as Karumari, is the Hindu goddess of rain, smallpox, health and cure. She is also an aspect of the Hindu goddess Parvati or Kali and another form of goddess Mariamman and Renuka. She is primarily worshipped in the villages of South India including as Thiruverkadu which is believed to be her abode.

Temples to her include Karumariamman Temple, Tiruverkadu, India; Karumariamman Temple, Penang, Malaysia; and Sri Mariamman Temple, Singapore,

== Gallery ==
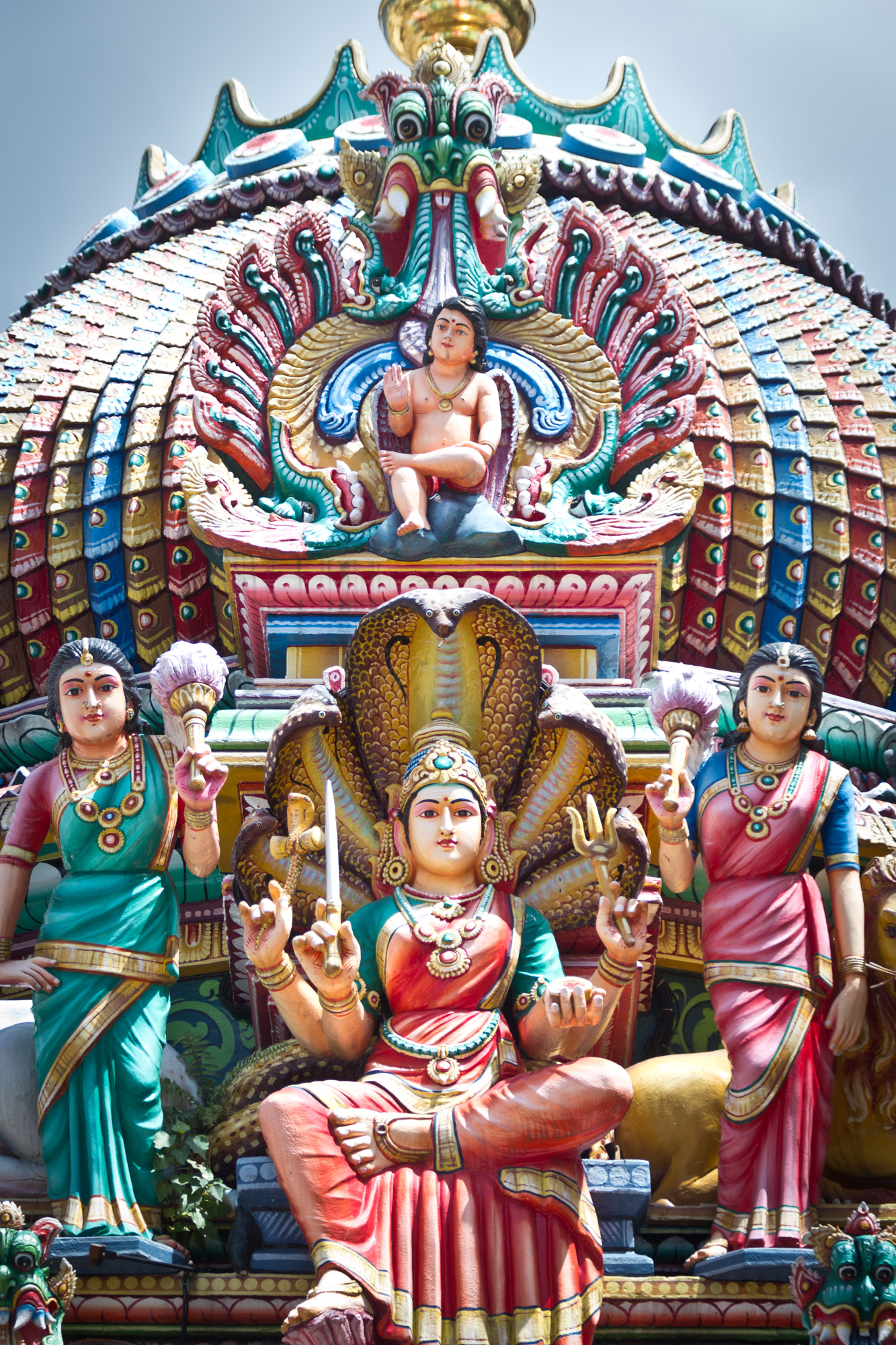
Image at Mariamman Temple, Singapore

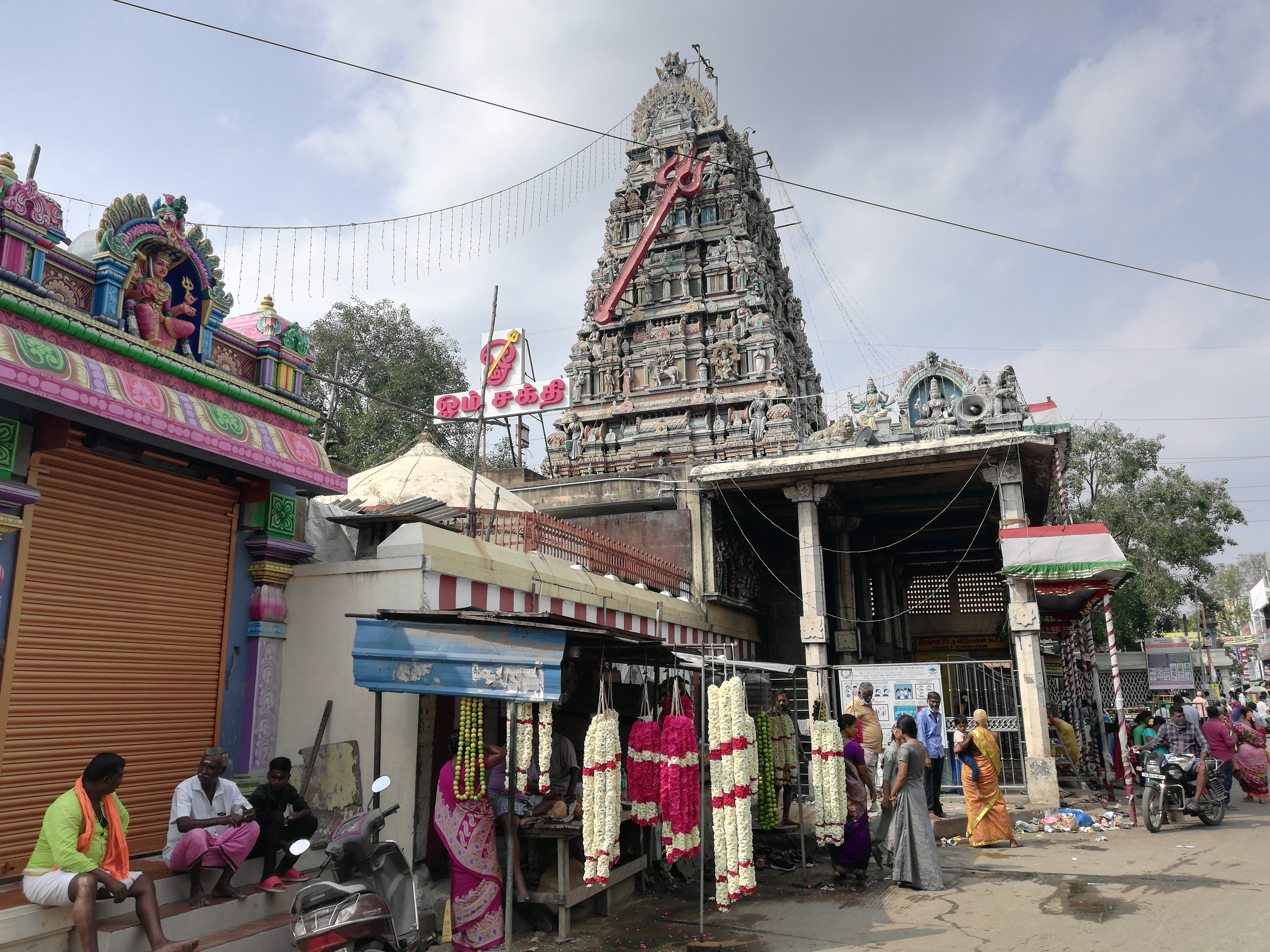
Karumariamman Temple, Tiruverkadu

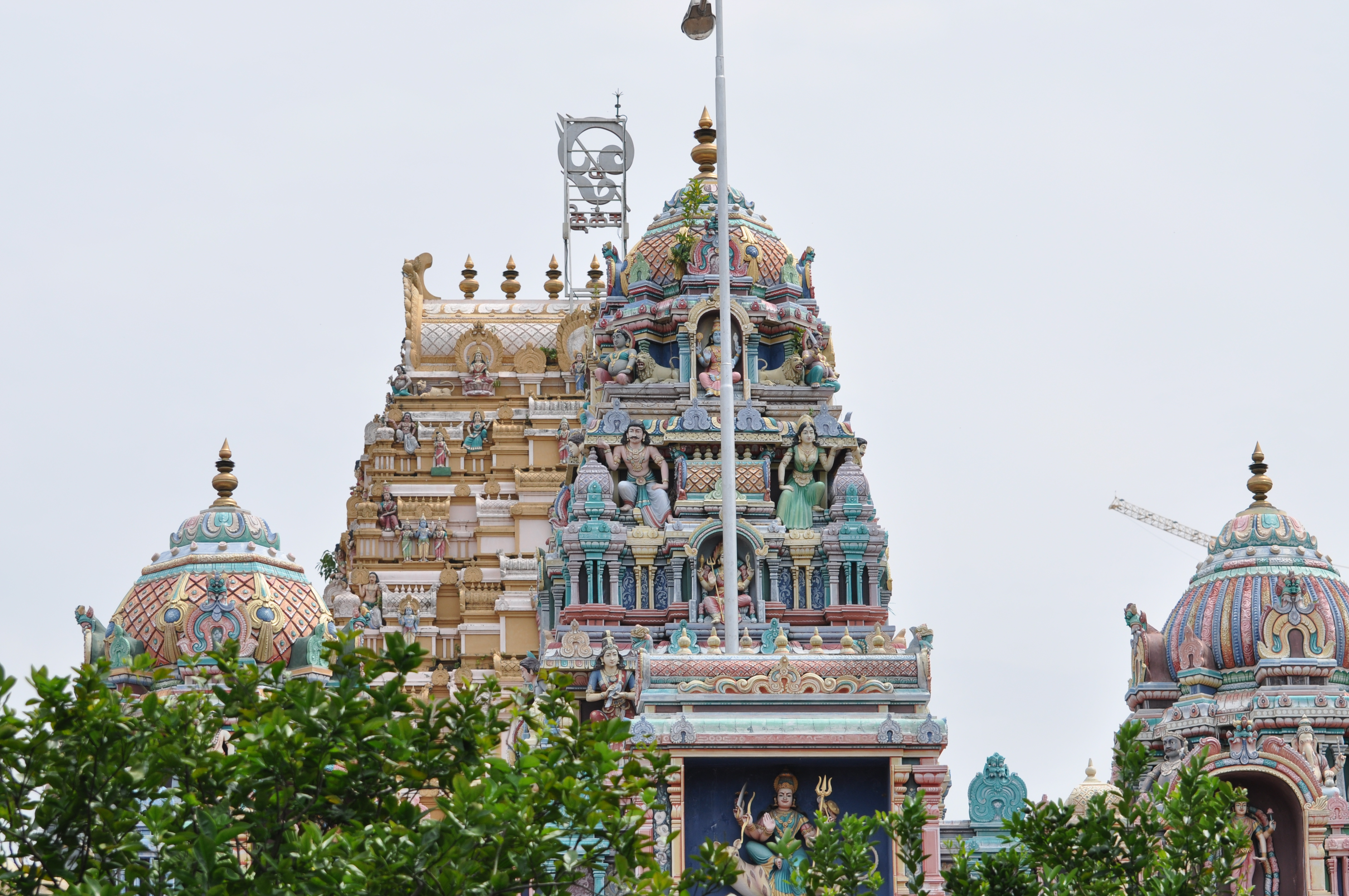
Karumariamman Temple, Penang, Malaysia
