= Vikramasingapuram =

Vikramasingapuram VK Puram
- Town
- Nickname: Singai
- Location in Tamil Nadu, India
- Coordinates: 8.67°N 77.33°E
- Country: India
- State: Tamil Nadu
- District: Tirunelveli
- Revenue Division: Cheranmahadevi
- Taluk: Ambasamudram

Government
  - Type: Second Grade Municipality
  - Body: Vikramasingapuram Municipality
- Elevation: 200 m (660 ft)

Population (2011)
  - Total: 47,241

Languages
  - Official: Tamil
- Time zone: UTC+5:30 (IST)
- PIN: 627425
- Vehicle registration: TN-72

Vickramasingapuram or V.K.Puram is a Town in Tirunelveli District in the Indian state of Tamil Nadu. It falls under the Ambasamudram Taluk. As of 2011, the town had a population of 47,241.

It is a small town located in Ambasamudram taluk and on the banks of river Thamirabarani, 46 km from Tirunelveli, the capital of the District. This place is at the southernmost end of the Western Ghats which is called as "Podhigai Hill". Various religions' and castes' people are residing peacefully here.

== Geography ==
Vikramasingapuram is located at 8.67°N 77.33°E. It has an average elevation of 200 metres (656 feet). It is situated 53 km to the west of Tirunelveli and 7 km from Ambasamudram. It is situated on the banks of river Thamirabarani.

Papanasam is 2 km from VKP and includes the Agasthiyar falls by which the Tamirabarani river descends into the plains. The water drops from a height of 100m over a wall of rock, covered both sides by forested hills of the Western Ghats.

It is close to the Agasthiyar Falls, on the banks of the Thamirabarani river. The falls has significant flow throughout the year unlike the seasonal Kutralam falls.

== Demographics ==
Religious census
| Religion | Percent(%) |
| Hindu | 78.62% |
| Muslim | 7.45% |
| Christian | 13.83% |
| Sikh | 0.02% |
| Buddhist | 0.02% |
| Other | 0.05% |

According to 2011 census, Vikramasingapuram had a population of 47,241 with a sex-ratio of 1,058 females for every 1,000 males, much above the national average of 929. A total of 4,198 were under the age of six, constituting 2,053 males and 2,145 females. Scheduled Castes and Scheduled Tribes accounted for 8.11% and 1.14% of the population respectively. The average literacy of the town was 81.28%, compared to the national average of 72.99%. The town had a total of 13558 households. There were a total of 19,811 workers, comprising 242 cultivators, 862 main agricultural labourers, 2,915 in house hold industries, 13,366 other workers, 2,426 marginal workers, 13 marginal cultivators, 413 marginal agricultural labourers, 549 marginal workers in household industries and 1,451 other marginal workers.

As per the religious census of 2011, Vikramasingapuram had 78.62% Hindus, 7.45% Muslims, 13.83% Christians, 0.02% Sikhs, 0.02% Buddhists and 0.05% following other religions.

== Tourist attractions ==
Kalakkad Mundanthurai Tiger Reserve. Located between elevations ranging from 1000 to 1500 Metres, the Manjolai area is set deep within the Western Ghats within the Kalakad Mundanthurai Tiger Reserve in the Tirunelveli District. Located on top of the Manimuthar Dam & the Manimuthar Water Falls, the Manjolai area comprises Tea Plantations, Small settlements around the tea plantations; Upper Kodaiyar Dam and a windy view point called Kuthiravetti.

== See also ==
- Andrews Matriculation School
