= Tiruverkadu =

Neighborhood in Chennai, India

Thiruverkadu
- Suburb
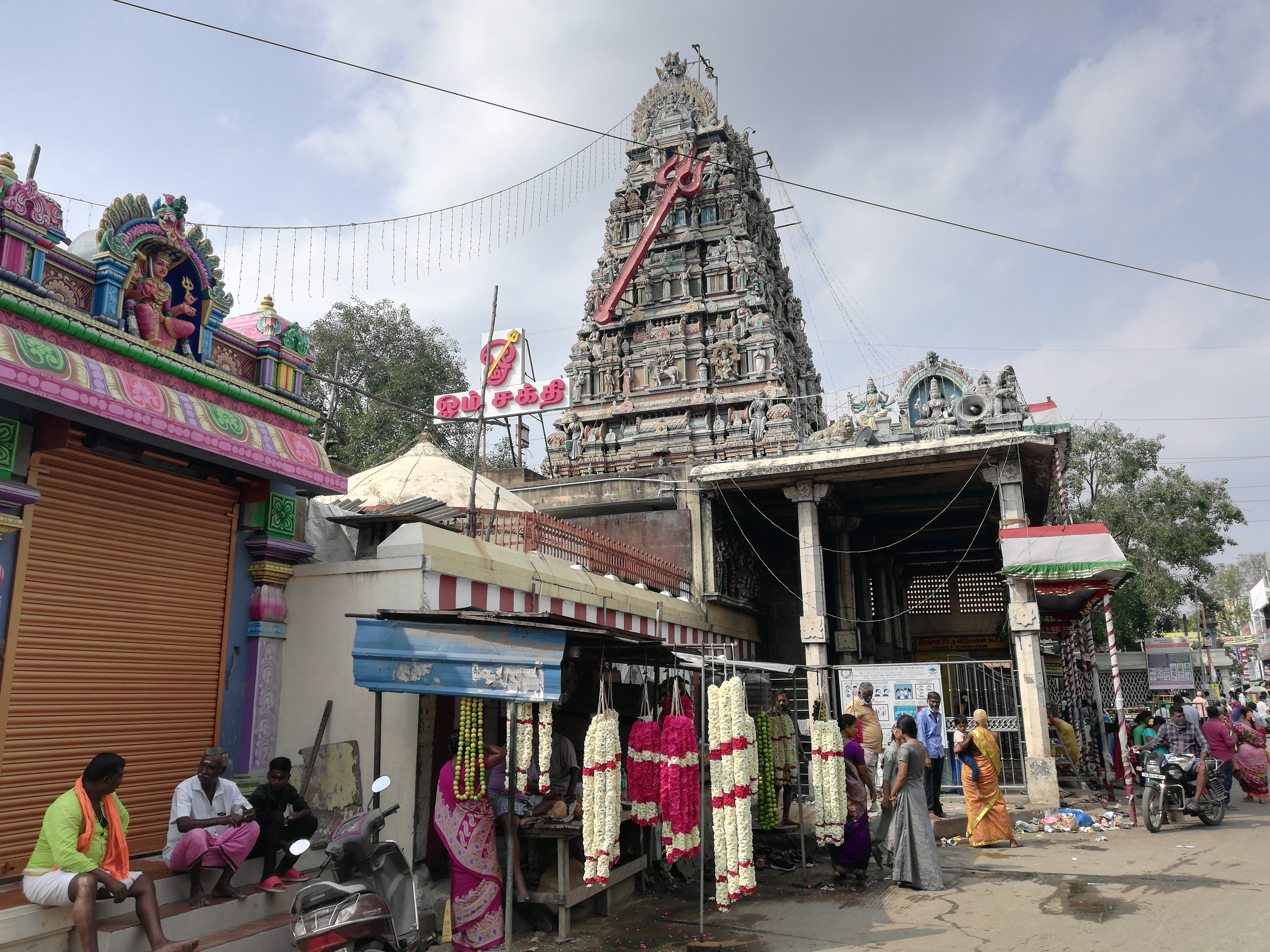
- Karumariamman Temple at Tiruverkadu

- Thiruverkadu (Chennai) Thiruverkadu (Tamil Nadu) Thiruverkadu (India)
- Coordinates: 13.073°N 80.127°E
- Country: India
- State: Tamil Nadu
- District: Thiruvallur
- Metro: Chennai

Area
  - Total: 28.50 km^{2} (11.00 sq mi)
- Elevation: 42 m (138 ft)

Population (2011)
  - Total: 62,289
  - Density: 2,186/km^{2} (5,661/sq mi)

Languages
  - Official: Tamil
- Time zone: UTC+5:30 (IST)
- PIN: 600 077
- Vehicle registration: TN 12 (RTO, Poonamallee)

Thiruverkadu (Tamil: [திருவேற்காடு]; literally 'a forest of holy herbs and roots') is a western suburb of Chennai, Tamil Nadu. It comes under Thiruvallur district administration. It is famous for its Devi Karumariamman Temple. There is also Vedapureeswarar Temple in Thiruverkadu, where Lord Shiva and Goddess Parvathi are seen in their wedding pose inside the sanctum sanctorum. As of 2011, the town had a population of 62,289. It is a town with rich cultural heritage and also a fast-growing areas in the city.

Thiruverkadu Selection Grade Municipal town in Thiruvallur District is Located at a very close proximity to Chennai mega city. This town possesses the appearance and Character similar to many of the town in Tamil Nadu which bears the seal of Religion. The famous temple in this town is devoted to Lord Sri Devi Karumariamman Temple and Lord Siva Temple. This Temple on each new moon day attract a large number of people from all around. It is the nucleus for the development of this town and present development pattern has emerged from a small village at the beginning of 50 years. Thiruverkadu town was constituted as a Municipality from 2004 onwards, Thiruverkadu is functioning as a grade III Municipality with 28.50 Sq. km in extent.

This town consists of seven revenue villages namely Thiruverkadu, Sundarasozhapuram, Koladi, Perumalagaram, Ayanambakkam, Veeraragavapuram and Numbal. The town is divided into 18 wards. Thiruverkadu town is located at a distance of 16 km west of Chennai City. This lies on Chennai-Bangalore National Highway Road and Chennai Thirupathi Trunk road. It is situated 13 9” North latitude and 79 55” E longitude. The present extent of this town is 10.75 km^{2}.

== Administration ==
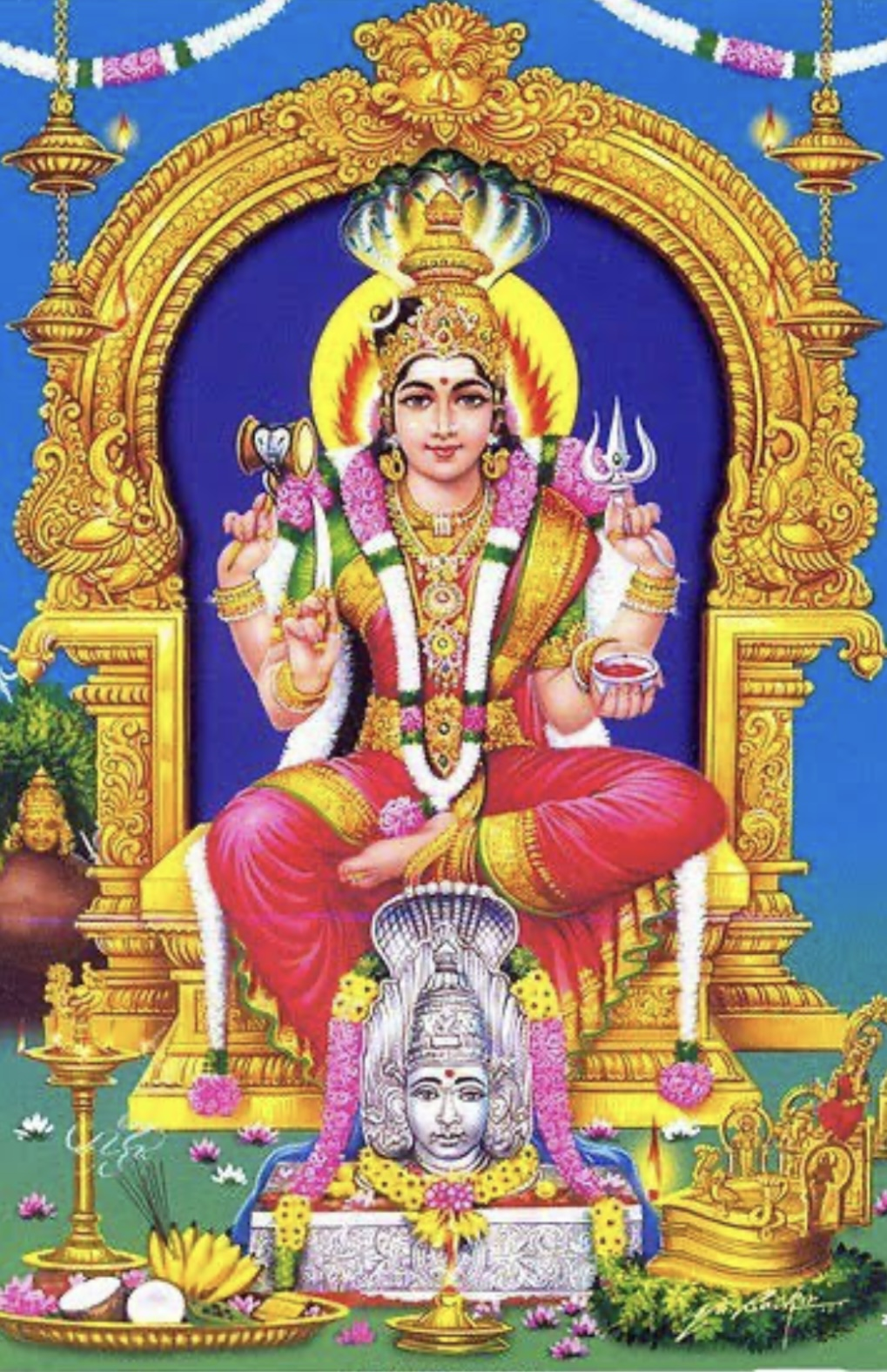
Goddess Karumariamman who is believed to be the principal and guardian goddess of Thiruverkadu.

Thiruverkadu is governed by Municipality of Thiruverkadu, coming under the Thiruvallur district. Thiruverkadu is selection grade Municipality. Thiruverkadu Municipality includes area of Thiruverkadu, Sundarasozhapuram, Koladi, Perumalagaram, Ayanambakkam, Veeraragavapuram and Numbal. Thiruverkadu Municipality is situated in the West Chennai of Tamil Nadu in Thiruvallur District. This town is surrounded with infrastructural facilities and it is near to visit Chennai Metropolitan Bus Terminal. The town's police comes directly under Chennai Metropolitan Police departments(Now comes under Avadi). On January 2025, in a process of expansion, the Thiruverkadu Municipality was merged with the Avadi City Municipal Corporation.

RTO: Thiruverkadu comes under RTO-Poonamallee (TN-12). Previously it was under Tiruvallur RTO (TN20).

== Demographics ==
According to 2011 census, Tiruverkadu had a population of 62,824 with a sex-ratio of 977 females for every 1,000 males, much above the national average of 929. A total of 7,189 were under the age of six, constituting 3,617 males and 3,572 females. Scheduled Castes and Scheduled Tribes accounted for 22.86% and 0.37% of the population respectively. The average literacy of the town was 74.35%, compared to the national average of 72.99%. The town had a total of 15,863 households. There were a total of 25,245 workers, comprising 138 cultivators, 210 main agricultural labourers, 628 in house hold industries, 21,770 other workers, 2,499 marginal workers, 57 marginal cultivators, 81 marginal agricultural labourers, 156 marginal workers in household industries and 2,205 other marginal workers. As per the religious census of 2011, Tiruverkadu (M + OG) had 93.17% Hindus, 1.36% Muslims, 4.98% Christians, 0.04% Sikhs, 0.05% Buddhists, 0.04% Jains, 0.33% following other religions and 0.03% following no religion or did not indicate any religious preference.

== Etymology ==
The neighbourhood had remained a dense neem forest since the ancient times. This resulted in the locality being called Velakadu, meaning "jungle of neem". The presence of a snake pit where goddess Karumari (Parvathi) is believed to be residing in the form of snake eventually gave the name Thiruverkaadu, with thiru being the Tamil equivalent of the honorific Hindu term "Sri".

== Location ==
The town is located 2 km from Chennai-Bangalore highway NH4 and 1.5 km from Avadi - Poonamalle road SH55. The town is 10.5 km from Chennai Metropolitan Bus Terminus CMBT. Nearby towns include Avadi, Porur, Kattupakkam, Iyyapantangal, Kumananchavadi, Karayanchavadi, Poonamalle, Paruthipattu, Ayapakkam, Ambattur, Vaangaram and Maduravoyal.

== Educational institutions ==
=== Colleges ===
- S.A Engineering College
- S.A Polytechnic College
- Mahalakshmi College Of Arts and Science
- Sindhi College Of Arts and Science
- Shenbaga Nursing College
- ACS Medical College and Hospital
- Saveetha Dental University
- Saveetha law college

=== Schools ===
- Government higher secondary schools
- Government primary schools
- S.K.D.J higher secondary school
- RMK CBSE School
- Sri Annai Vidhyashram Matric Higher Secondary School
- Ramakrishna Vidya Niketan higher secondary school
- The Pupil Saveetha Eco School
- Saraswathi matriculation higher secondary school
- Maharishi School of Excellence Senior Secondary
- Janet Matriculation school
- Narayana group of schools
- Velammal cbse school

== Hospitals ==
- Government primary health centre, veeraraghavapuram
- Gayathri hospital, Mgr nagar
- Abhishek hospital
- Rotary club clinic, sannathi street
- Saveetha Dental University, Velappanchavadi
- ACS Medical College and Hospital, Velappanchavadi
- Dr Mehtha's hospital, Velappanchavadi
- Aravind eye hospital
- E.J Health Care

== Temples ==
- Karumariamman Temple
- Vedapureeswarar Temple

== Transport ==
=== Bus ===
Thiruverkadu is easily accessible from most parts of the city by bus. The Thiruverkadu bus terminus provides services to T.Nagar, Tambaram, Vadapalani, Iyapantangal, Ambattur Industrial Estate, Villivakkam, Perambur, Vallalar Nagar, Thiruvotriyur, Broadway, Anna square, Mangadu, Velachery, Avadi, Kilambakkam.

Via Thiruverkadu

Route number	Start	End	Via
150	Broadway	Avadi	Central, Aminjikarai, Arumbakkam, Koyambedu, Maduravoyal, Thiruverkadu, Paruthipattu
159	Thiruverkadu	Thiruvotriyur	Maduravoyal, Nerkundram, Koyambedu, Arumbakkam, Aminjikarai, Kilpauk, Purasawakkam, Mint
63	Thiruverkadu	Villivakkam	Koladi, Ayapakkam, Ambattur Estate, Padi
S24	Thiruverkadu	Iyyapanthangal	Vaanagaram, Chettiyar Agaram, Srmc
72	Thiruverkadu	T.Nagar	Maduravoyal, Cmbt, Vadapalani, Kodambakkam
29E	Thiruverkadu	Perambur	Maduravoyal, Koyambedu, Aminjikarai, Kilpauk, Jamalia, Otteri
50	Thiruverkadu	Broadway	Maduravoyal, Koyambedu, Aminjikarai, Central
59	Thiruverkadu	V.Nagar	Maduravoyal, Koyambedu, Aminjikarai, Purasaiwakkam, Choolai, Regal
S59	Thiruverkadu	Mangadu	Acs medical college, Saveetha, Kattupakkam
111	Thiruverkadu	Tambaram	Maduravoyal, Cmbt, Vadapalani, Airport, Pallavaram
S52	Thiruverkadu	Avadi	Paruthipattu, Govardhana Giri, Jb estate, Avadi market
S73	Thiruverkadu	Ambattur industrial Estate	Mugappair West, Wavin, Ambattur Industrial Estate
