= Papanasanathar Temple =

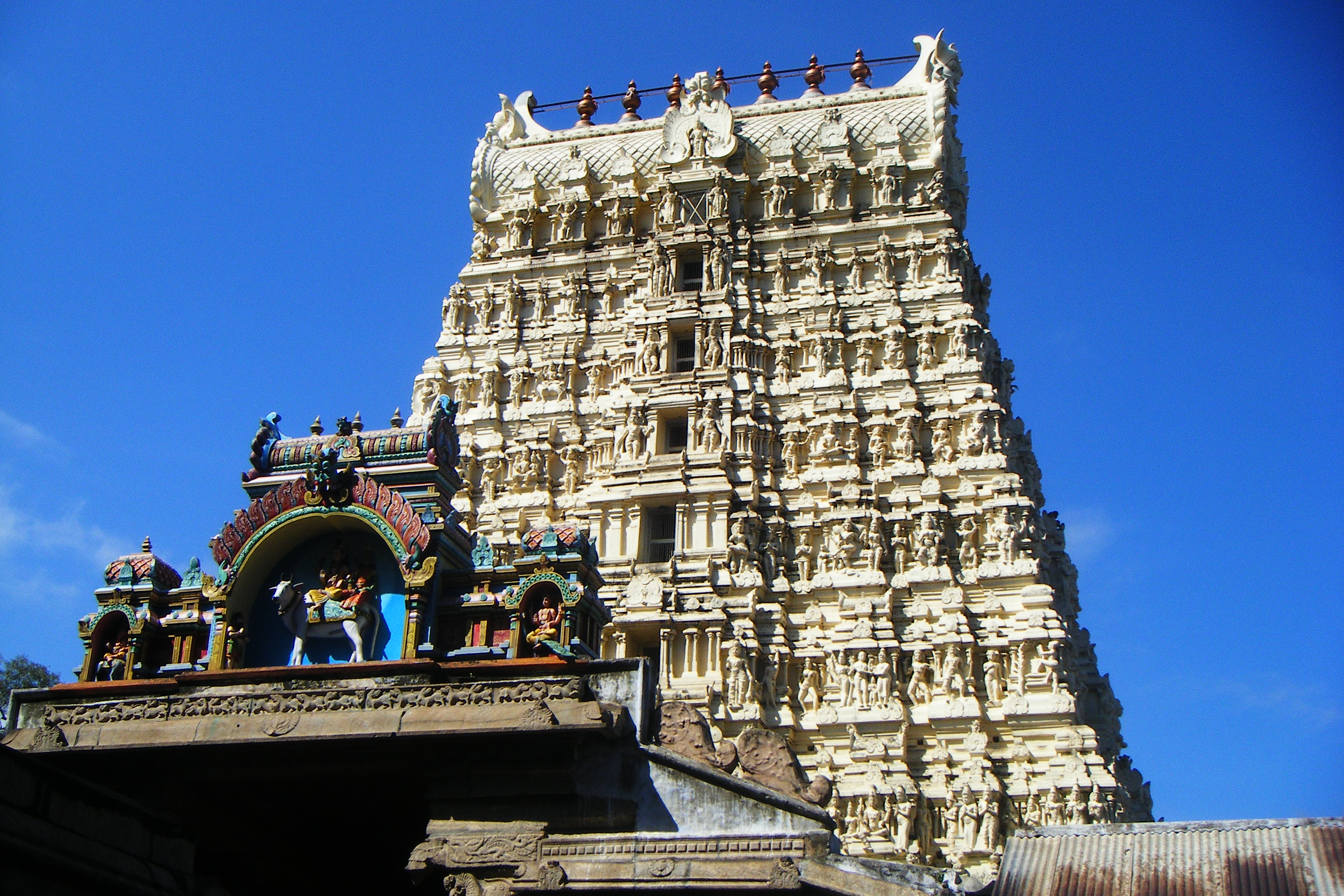

- Location in Tamil Nadu

Religion
- Affiliation: Hinduism
- District: Tirunelveli
- Deity: Papanasanathar(Shiva), Ulagammai (Parvathi)

Location
- Location: Papanasam, Tirunelveli
- State: Tamil Nadu
- Country: India
- Interactive map of Papanasanathar Temple
- Coordinates: 8°42′48″N 77°24′21″E

Architecture
- Type: Tamil architecture

Papanasanathar Temple in Papanasam, a village in Tirunelveli district in the South Indian state of Tamil Nadu, is dedicated to Hindu god Shiva. It is located 60 km from Tirunelveli. Constructed in the Dravidian architecture, the temple has three precincts. Shiva is worshipped as Papanasanathar and his consort Parvathi as Ulagammai.

A granite wall surrounds the temple, enclosing all its shrines. The temple has a seven-tiered gateway tower. The temple was originally built by Chandrakula Pandya, with further additions by the Vijayanagar and Nayak kings during the 16th century. The temple has artistic sculptures representative of Nayak art.

The temple is open from 5.30 am - 12 pm and 4.30-7:30 pm on all days except during festival days when it is open the full day. Six daily rituals and three yearly festivals are held at the temple, of which the Brahmotsavam festival during the Tamil months of Chittirai (April - May) and Thaipoosam during Thai (January - February) being the most prominent. The temple is maintained and administered by the Hindu Religious and Endowment Board of the Government of Tamil Nadu.

== Legend and religious significance ==
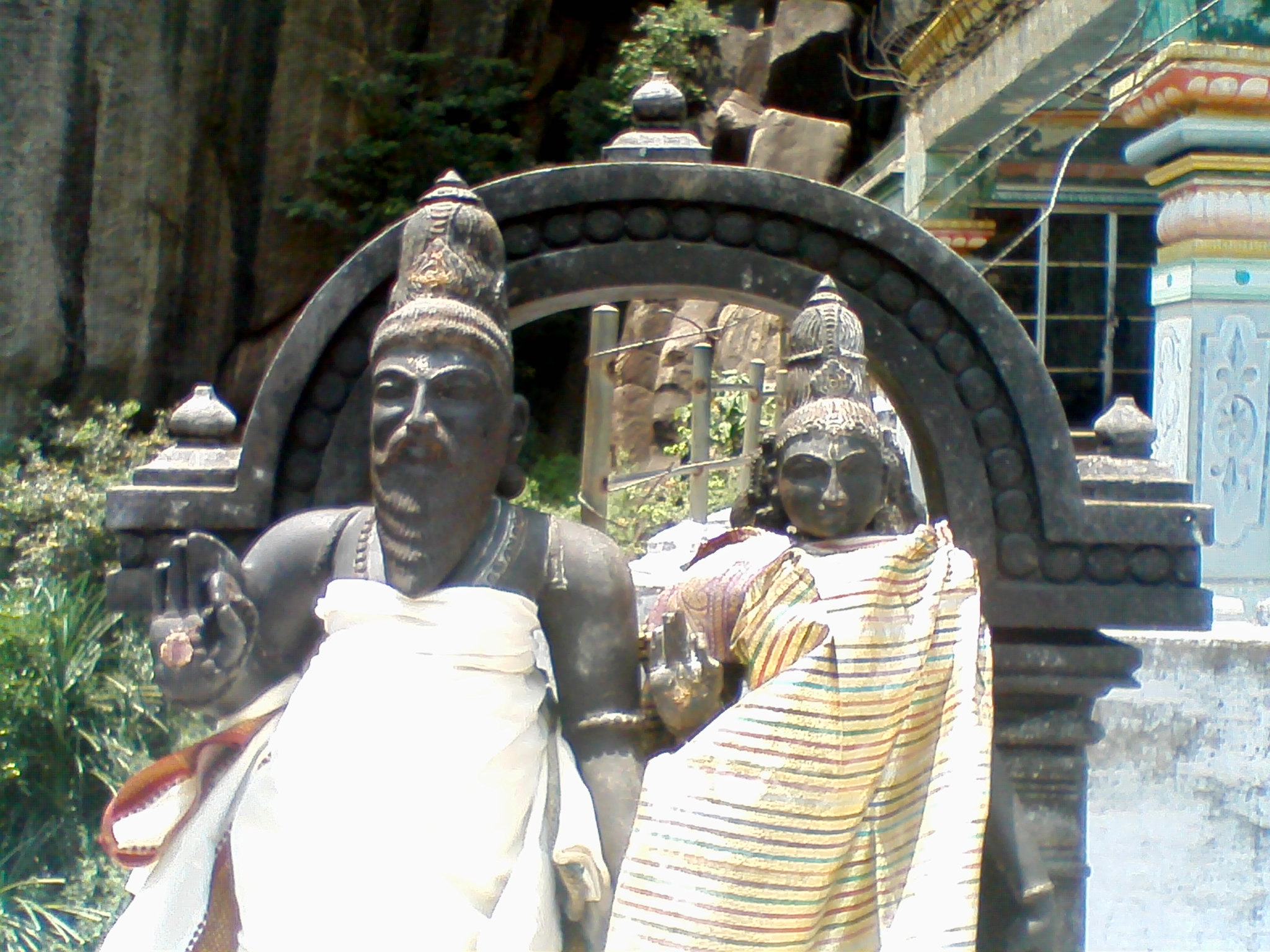
Image of sage Agasthya with his wife, Lopamudra

As per Hindu legend, during the divine wedding of Shiva and Parvathi, there was heavy crowd at Kailash. Sage Agasthya could not get a vision of the event and was praying to Shiva at this place and pleased by his devotion, Shiva appeared to him and his wife Lopamundra in Kalyana posture. The falls nearby the temple is thus called Agasthiyar Falls.

As per another legend, sage Urosamar floated a set of flowers in Tamiraparani River and the first flower reached the shore at this place. The sage established a temple for Papanasanathar and worshipped the deity here.

The lingam, the iconic form of Shiva in the temple is believed to an aspect of Surya, one of the planetary deities. The temple forms a series of Navagraha temples in the banks of Tamiraparani river where each of the nine planetary deities are considered to reside in one temples. The temples are classified as Nava Kailasam and the presiding deity of all the nine temples is Kailasanathar. The temple is associated with the planet Surya (Sun) and considered first in the series of the nine temples.

The lingam is believed to have appeared from kala tree and is called as Mukkala Nathar.

There are images of Somaskanda, Rishabaroodar and Agastya close to the image with unique sculptural representation.

As per another legend, the king of celestial deities, Indra slayed a demon Dwastha, the son of Sukracharya (the Guru of Asuras) as he was performing a penance to seek superior powers against the Devas. Indra incurred Brahmatti Dosha, a sin attained for slaying the Brahmin. He roamed around a lot of places for doing penance and finally on the advice of Brihaspathi, he landed at Papanasam. Since his sin (Papam locally) was expiated in this place, it came to be known as Papanasam. This Legend is to Elucidate the real Importance of Good Brahmin Communities and also the Power of Temple

== Architecture ==
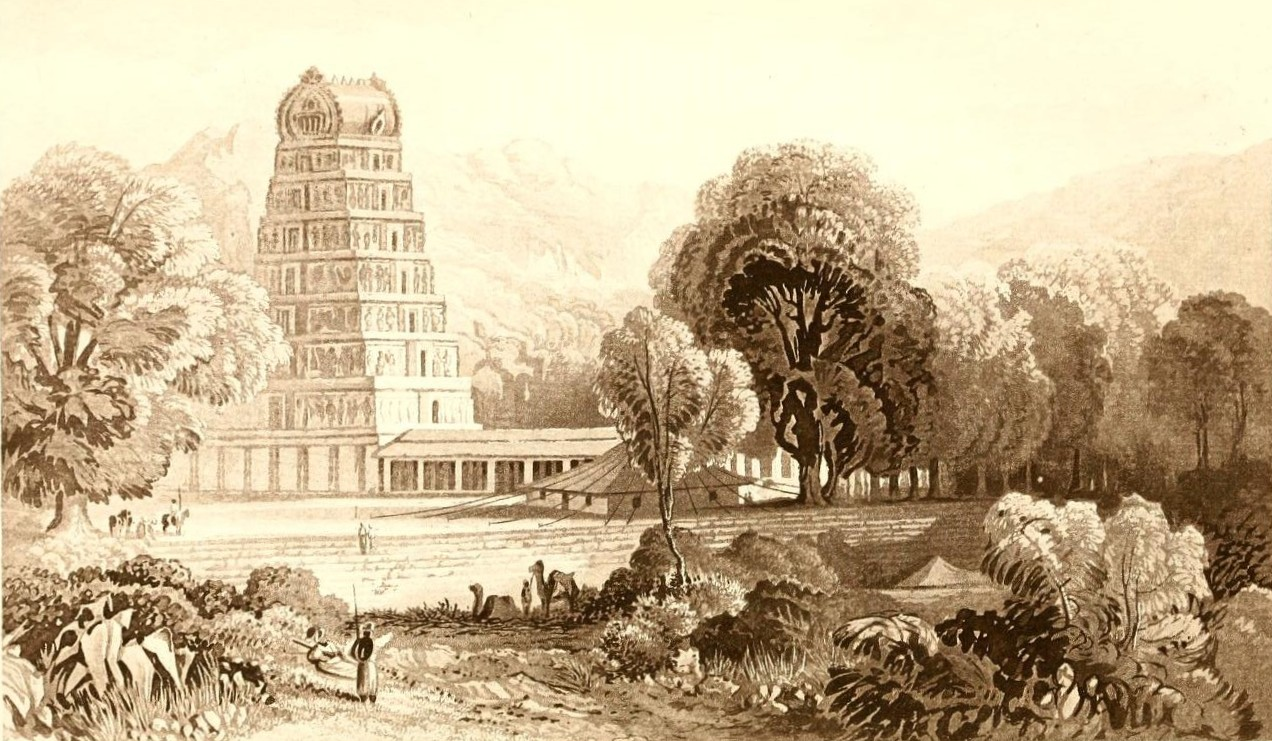
Historical image of the temple

A granite wall surrounds the temple, enclosing all its shrines, pierced by a seven-tiered gateway tower. The image of Papanasanathar in the form of Lingam is housed in the sanctum. The shrine of Ulagammai is housed in a west facing shrine. The shrine also houses the images of Vinayaka, Subramanyar, Dakshinamurthy, Durga, and Navagrahas on the walls. The west facing shrine adjacent to the flagstaff has a hall with yali pillars, where Nataraja is housed. Natarja is routed in Ananda Thandava posture and also called as Punugu Sabapathy. The temple tank in the temple is called Papanasa Theertham, while two other tanks namely Agasthya Theertham and Kalyani Theertham are also associated with the temple. There is a pounding stone in front of Ulagammai shrine where ladies grind turmeric. The turmeric is used during sacred ablution and also used by the devotees after the worship.

== History ==
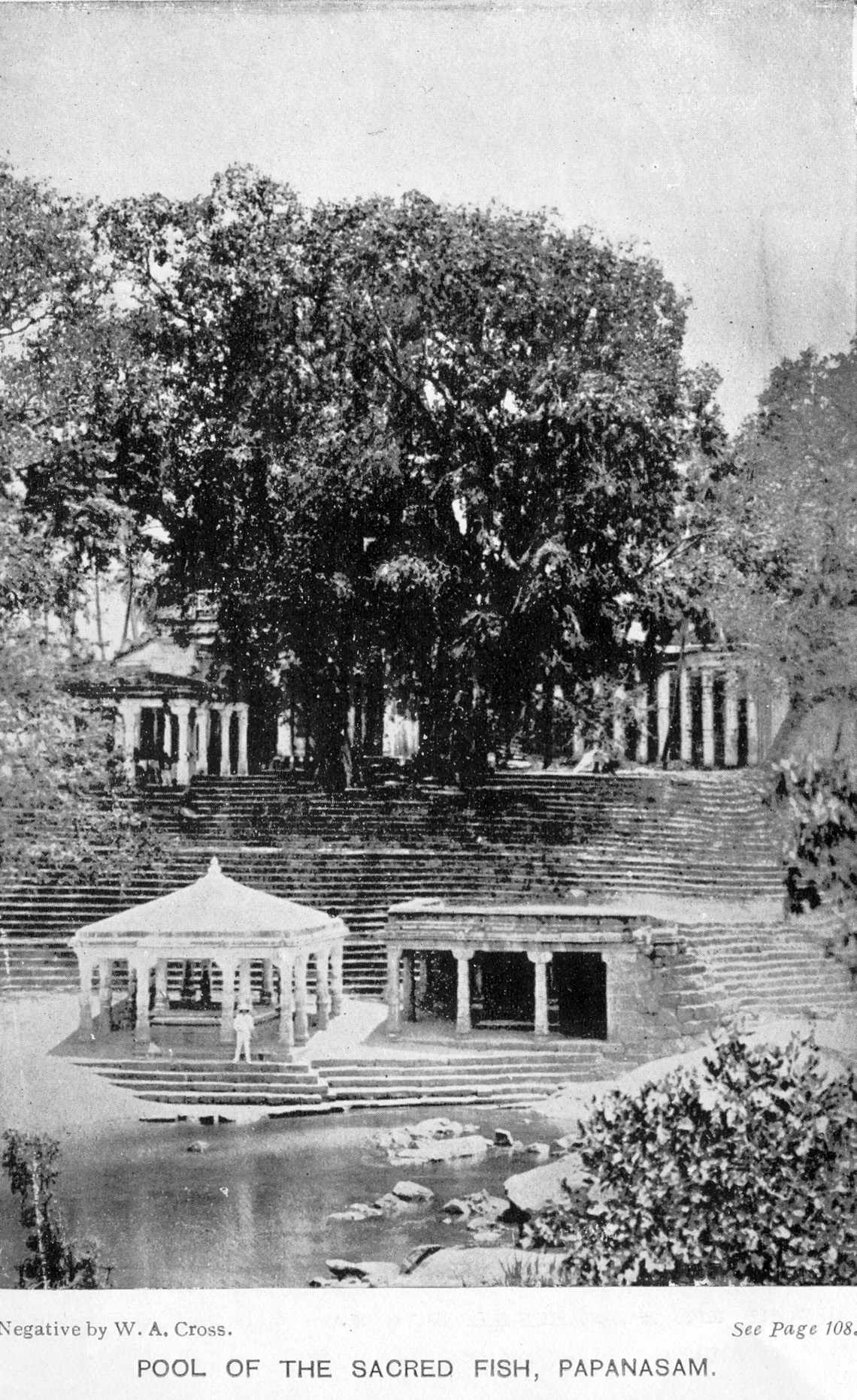
The temple tank

The exact history of the temple could not be ascertained, but it is originally believed to have been built by the Pandya king, Chandrakula Pandya, who ruled over the regions of Madurai. He built the central shrine and vimana of the temple. Veerappa Nayaka (1609-23 AD), a ruler of Madurai Nayak dynasty built the Yagasala, dwajasthamba (flag staff) and Nataraja hall. In modern times, the temple is maintained and administered by the Hindu Religious and Endowment Board of the Government of Tamil Nadu.

== Festival ==
The temple follows Saivite tradition. The temple priests perform the pooja (rituals) during festivals and on a daily basis. The temple rituals are performed six times a day: Tiruvananthal at 6:30 a.m., Sirualasanthi at 7:00 a.m., Kalasanthi at 8:30 a.m., Uchikalam at 11:30 p.m., Sayarakshai at 6:00 p.m., and Arthajamam between 8:00 - 8:00 p.m. Each ritual has three steps: alangaram (decoration), neivethanam (food offering) and deepa aradanai (waving of lamps) for both Papanasanathar and Ulagammai. During Uchikala pooja, the food offered to the deities is offered to the fish in Tamirabarani river. There are weekly, monthly and fortnightly rituals performed in the temple. The temple is open from 6am - 1 pm and 4-8:30 pm on all days except during new moon days when it is open the full day. The Brahmotsavam festival celebrated during the Tamil months of Chittirai (April - May) and Thaipoosam during Thai (January - February) are the most prominent festivals of the temple. Other festivals like Sivarathri and Agasthiyar Thirukalyanam (sacred marriage) are also celebrated.
