= Agasthiyar Falls =

- Papanasam Falls
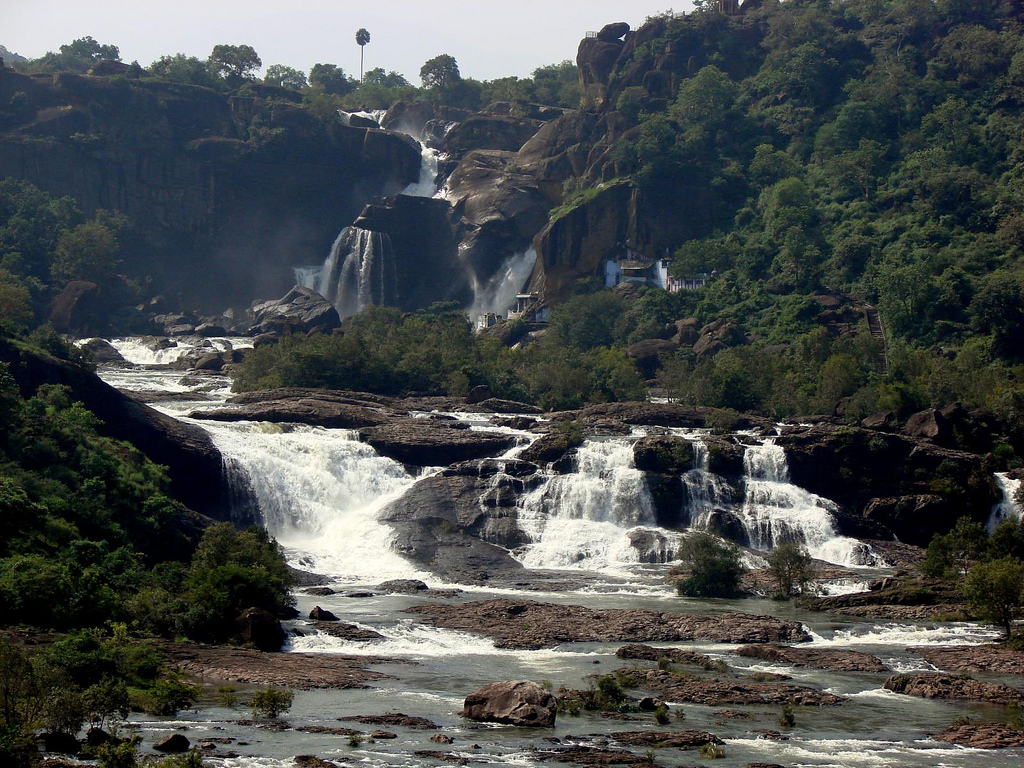
- Cascade of Papanasam Falls

- Location within Tamil Nadu
- Location: Papanasam, Tirunelveli district, Tamil Nadu
- Coordinates: 8°42′14.23″N 77°21′49.07″E
- Type: Segmented Plunges
- Total height: 300 ft (91 m)
- Watercourse: Tamiraparani River

Agasthiyar Falls (also called Papanasam Falls) is located close to Papanasam in Tirunelveli district in the South Indian state of Tamil Nadu. The falls is located on the Western Ghats and to the south of Papanasam lower, the lake from where Tamiraparani River originates. It is located 42 km (26 mi) from the nearest city Tirunelveli. As per Hindu legend, it is the place where sage Agasthya got a view of Shiva in his marriage costume.

The Tirunelveli district administration organises Chittirai Vishnu festival every year during the Tamil month of Chittirai (April - May), during the Tamil New Year day. The falls is a prominent tourist destination in the region and usually frequented by devotees of the Papanasanathar Temple and Sabarimala.

== Legend ==
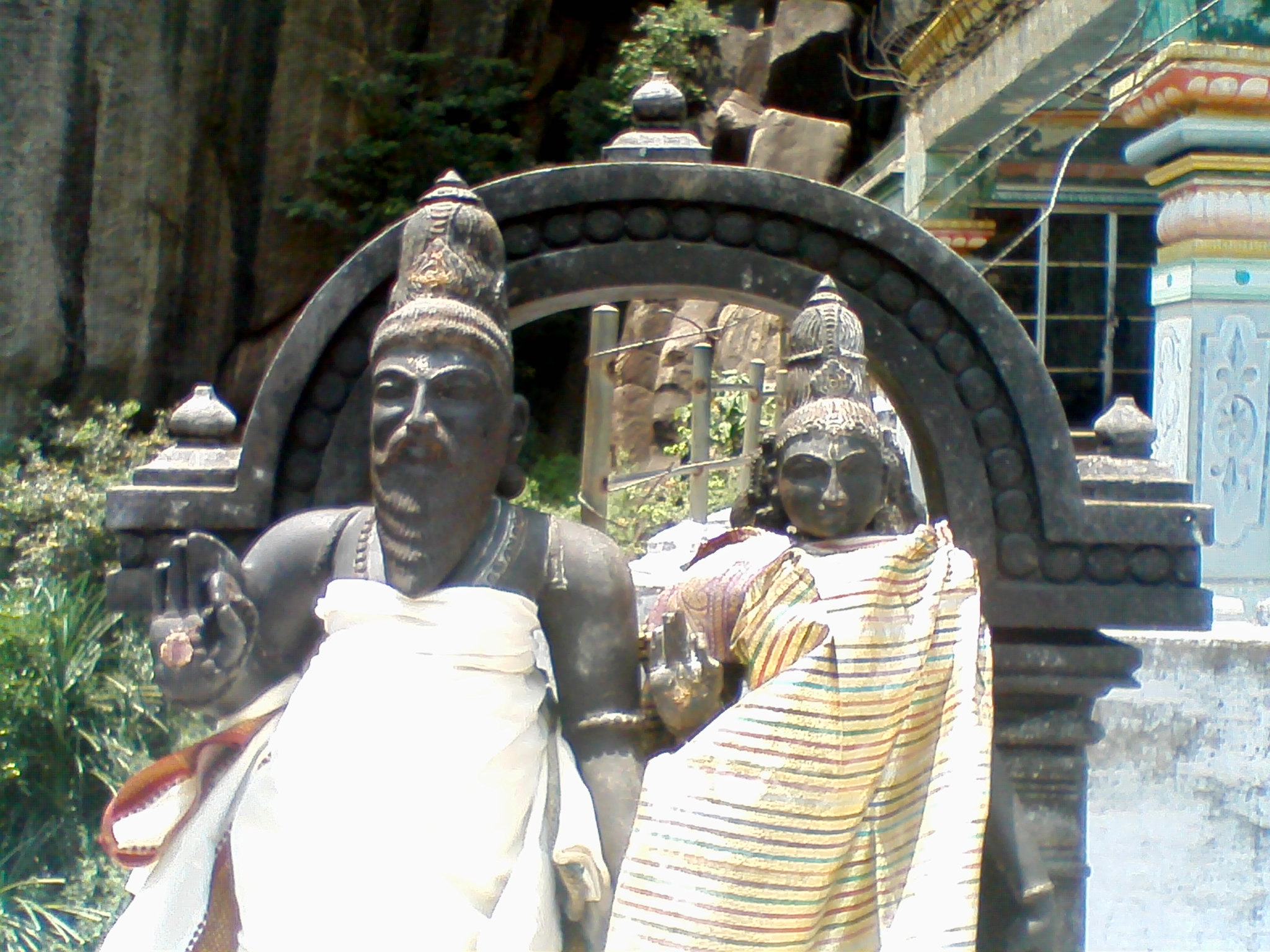
Image of sage Agasthya with his wife

As per Hindu legend, during the divine wedding of Shiva and Parvathi, there was heavy crowd at Kailash, the abode of Shiva. Sage Agasthya could not view event and prayed to Shiva at this place to get him a view of the event. Pleased by his devotion, Shiva appeared to the sage and his wife Lopamundra along with Parvathi in his marriage attire. Shiva made the place his abode and came to be called Papanasanathar and the falls nearby the temple got the name of Agasthiyar as Agasthiyar Falls. Tamiraparani River reaches is descent in flat land at this place. As per another legend, sage Urosamar floated a set of flowers in the river and the first flower reached the shore at this place. The sage established a temple for Papanasanathar and worshipped the deity here.

As per another legend, the king of celestial deities, Indra slayed a demon Dwastha, the son of Sukracharya (the Guru of Asuras, the demons) as he was performing a penance to seek superior powers against the Devas. Indra incurred Brahmatti Dosha, a sin attained for slaying the Brahmin. He roamed around a lot of places for doing penance and finally on the advice of Brihaspathi, he landed at Papanasam. Since his sin (Papam locally) was expiated in this place, it came to be known as Papanasam.

== Geography ==
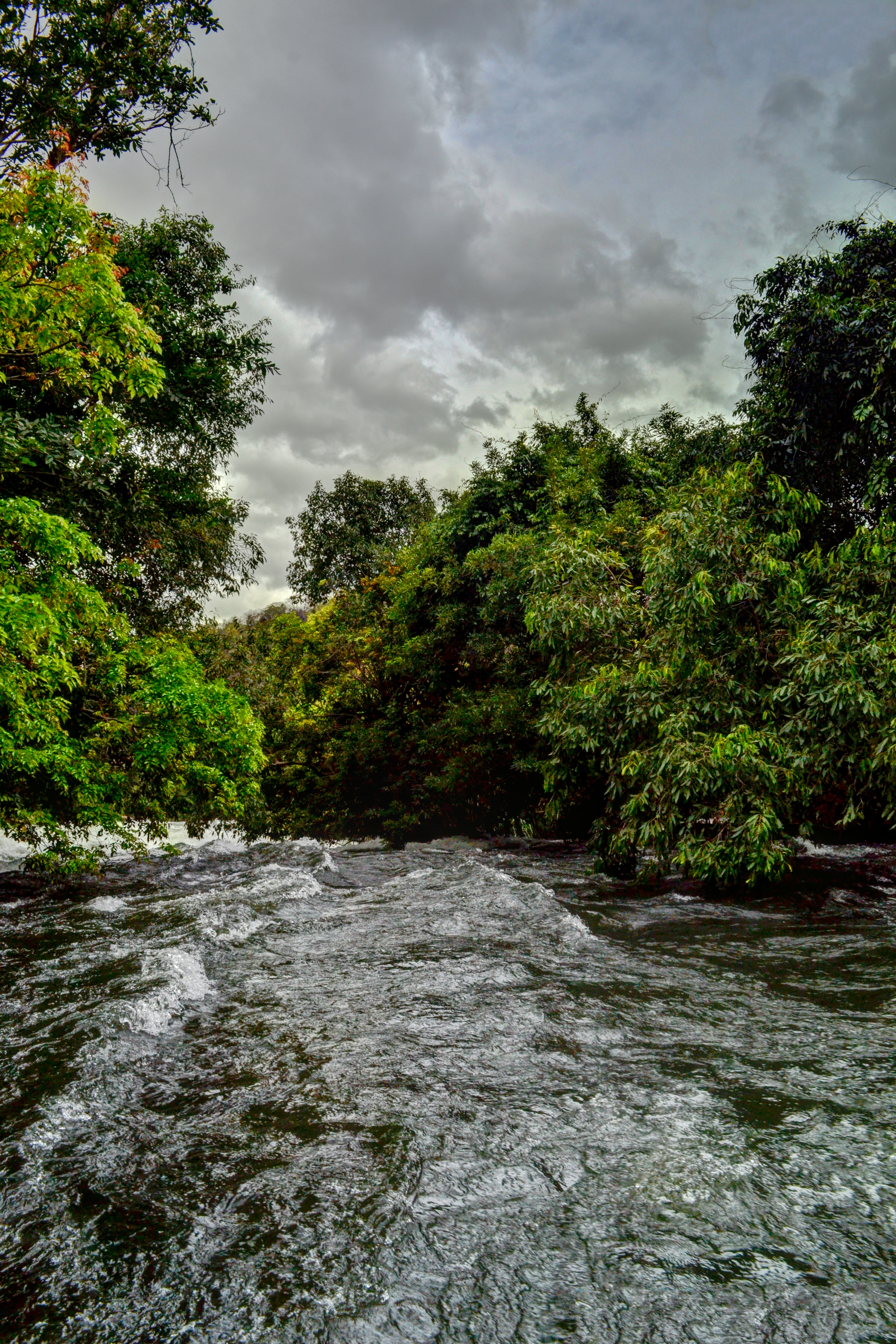
Image of downstream Thamirabarani

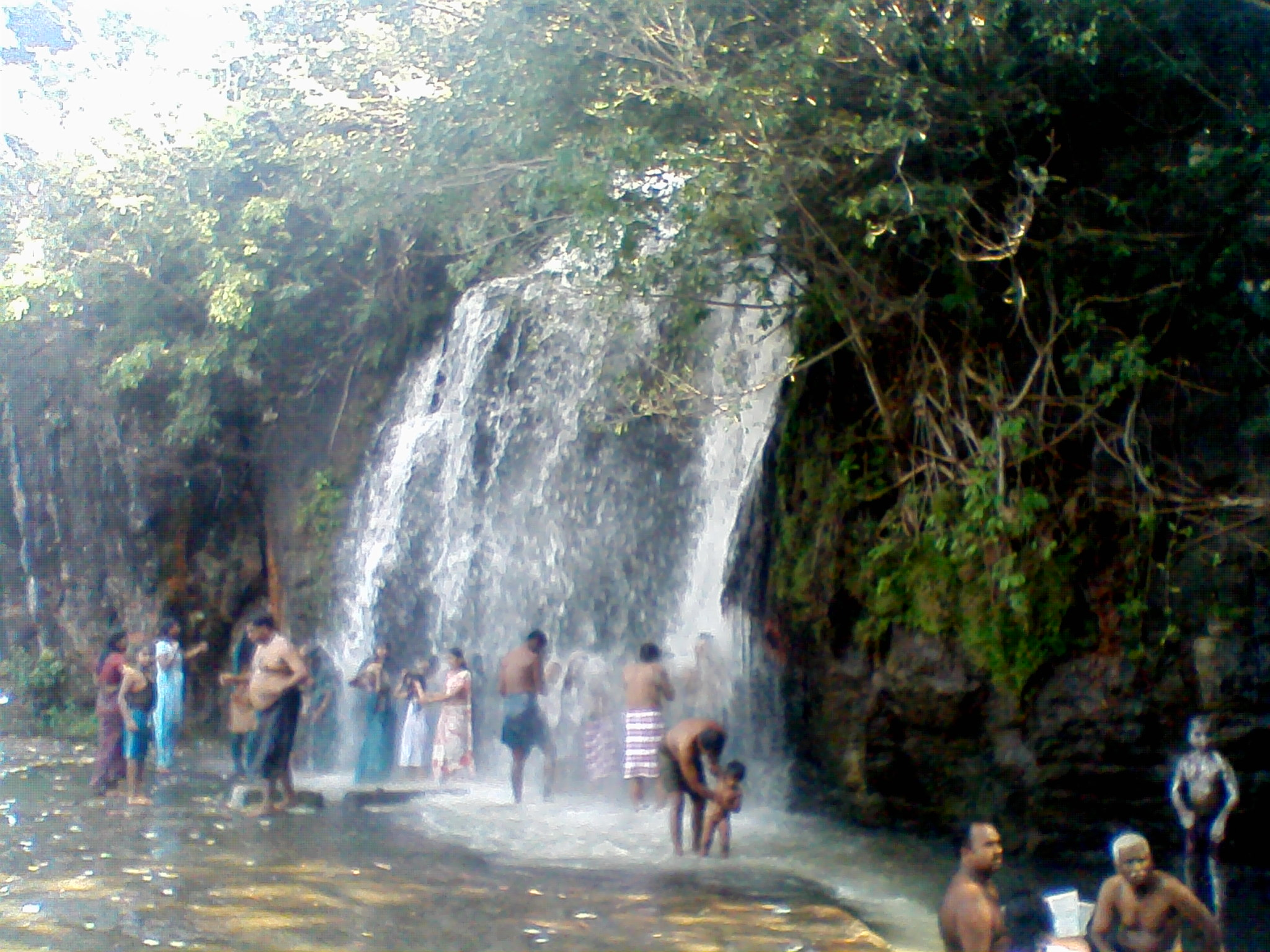
Image of falls

Agasthiyar Falls is located in Western Ghats to the South of Papanasam town and to the north of Papanasam Lower, the first lake in the descent of Tamiraparani River. It is located 42 km (26 mi) from the nearest city Tirunelveli. The waters from the falls meanders the stream in the river to Papansam hydro electric project and reaches the catchment area to the Papanasam Dam, which has a storage capacity of 142.15 ft (43.33 m). The place is frequented by animals like Tiger and Panther, which are frequently spotted in the route from Agasthiyar Falls to Papansam as both are located close to Kalakkad Mundanthurai Tiger Reserve. The falls receives its waters during the South-west monsoon from May to September, but the maximum amount of rainfall is received during the North-east monsoon during October to December.But the falls is commonly said by the nearby locales as 365 days falls as people can go there any day because the water is from the dam hence the water flow will not be affected by the monsoon to a large extent. There is a small temple of Agasthiyar near the falls, where devotees worship after taking a holy dip in the falls.

== Culture ==
The Tirunelveli district administration organises Chittirai Vishnu festival every year during the Tamil month of Chittirai (April - May), during the Tamil New Year day. The falls is usually frequented by devotees of the Papanasanathar Temple, who take a holy dip in the falls before visiting the temple. The falls is also frequented by tourists to Sabarimala during the November - December season in a religious circuit in the region and Kutralam falls. Flood warning is issued during North-east monsoon when excessive rain results in overflow and the falls remain closed for the visitors.

== See also ==
- List of waterfalls
- List of waterfalls in India
