= Tiruverkadu Devi Karumariamman Temple =

Hindu temple in Chennai, Tamil Nadu, India

Coordinates: 13.072°N 80.124°E

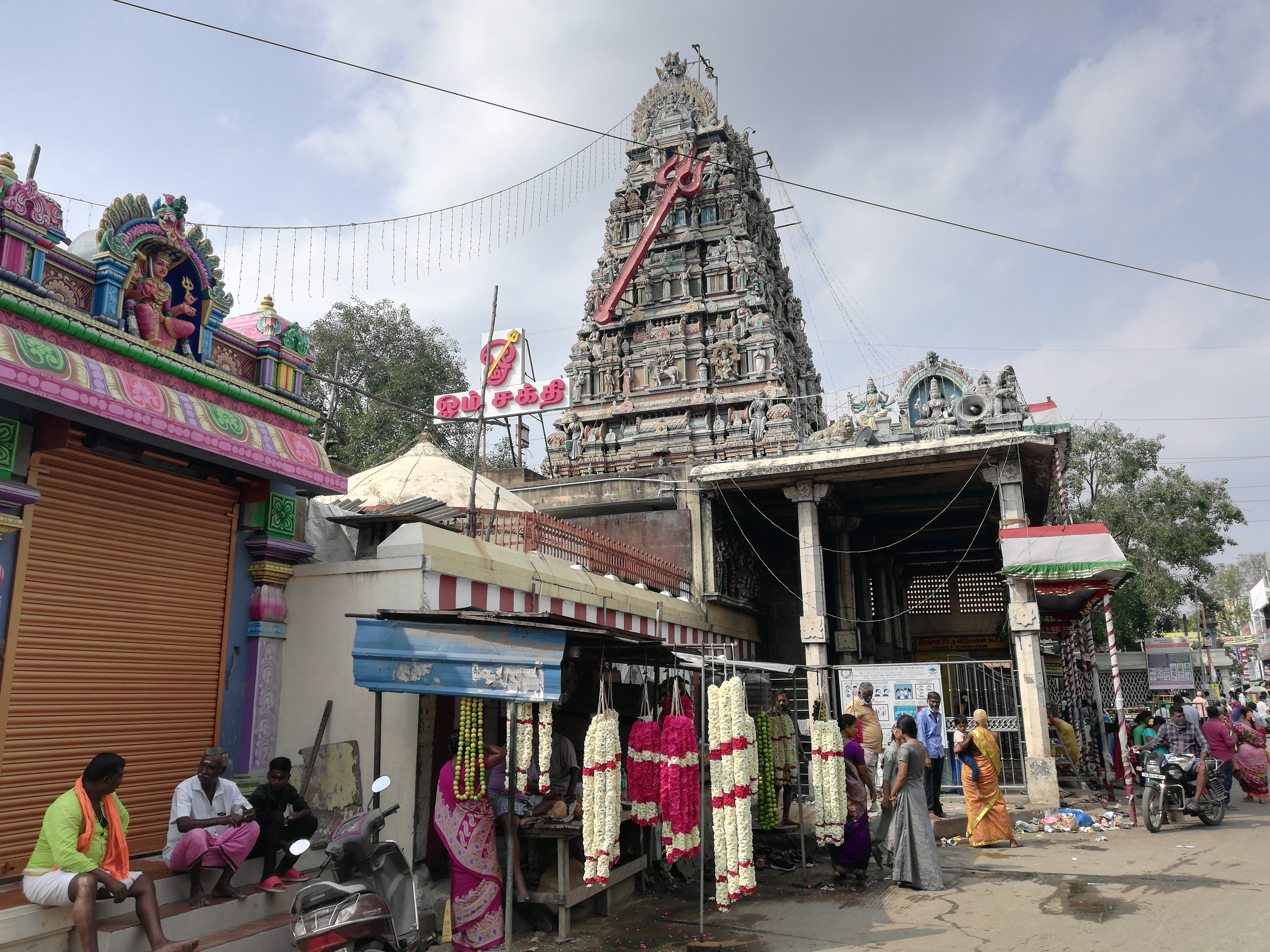
- Tiruverkadu Devi Karumariamman Temple

Religion
- Affiliation: Hinduism
- District: Chennai
- Deity: Karumariamman

Location
- Location: Tiruverkadu
- State: Tamil Nadu
- Country: India
- Interactive map of Tiruverkadu Devi Karumariamman Temple

Tiruverkadu Devi Karumariamman Temple is a Hindu temple in Tiruverkadu, a suburb of Chennai, in Tamil Nadu, India, maintained and administered by the Hindu Religious and Charitable Endowments Department of the Government of Tamil Nadu.

== Etymology ==
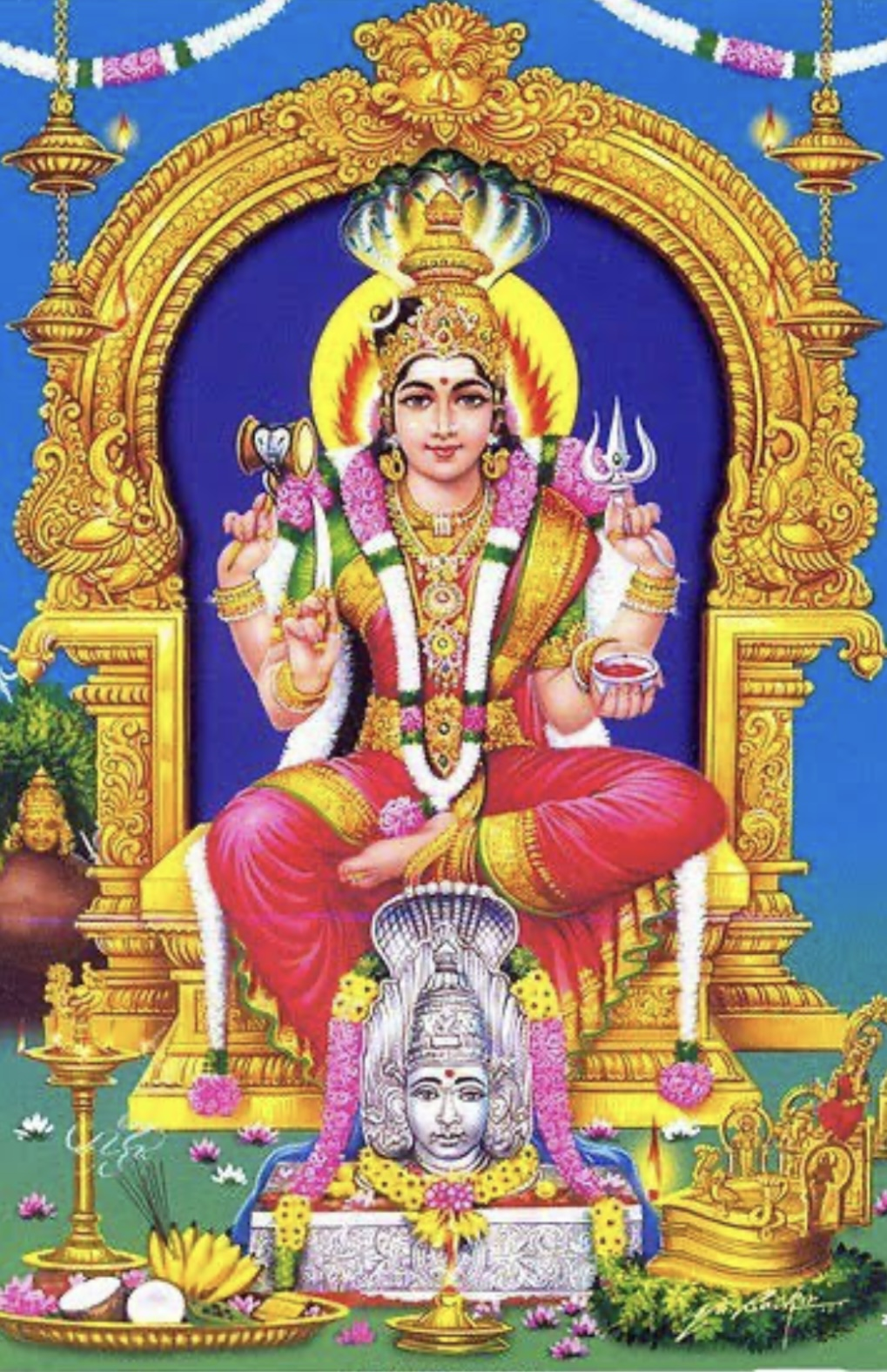
Karumariamman is believed to be the principal and guardian goddess of Thiruverkadu.

The neighbourhood had remained a dense neem forest since the ancient times. This resulted in the locality being called Velakadu, meaning "jungle of neem". The presence of a snake pit where Karumari (considered an incarnation of Parvathi) is believed to be residing in the form of snake eventually gave the name Thiruverkadu, with thiru being the Tamil equivalent of the honorific Hindu term "Sri".

== Legend ==
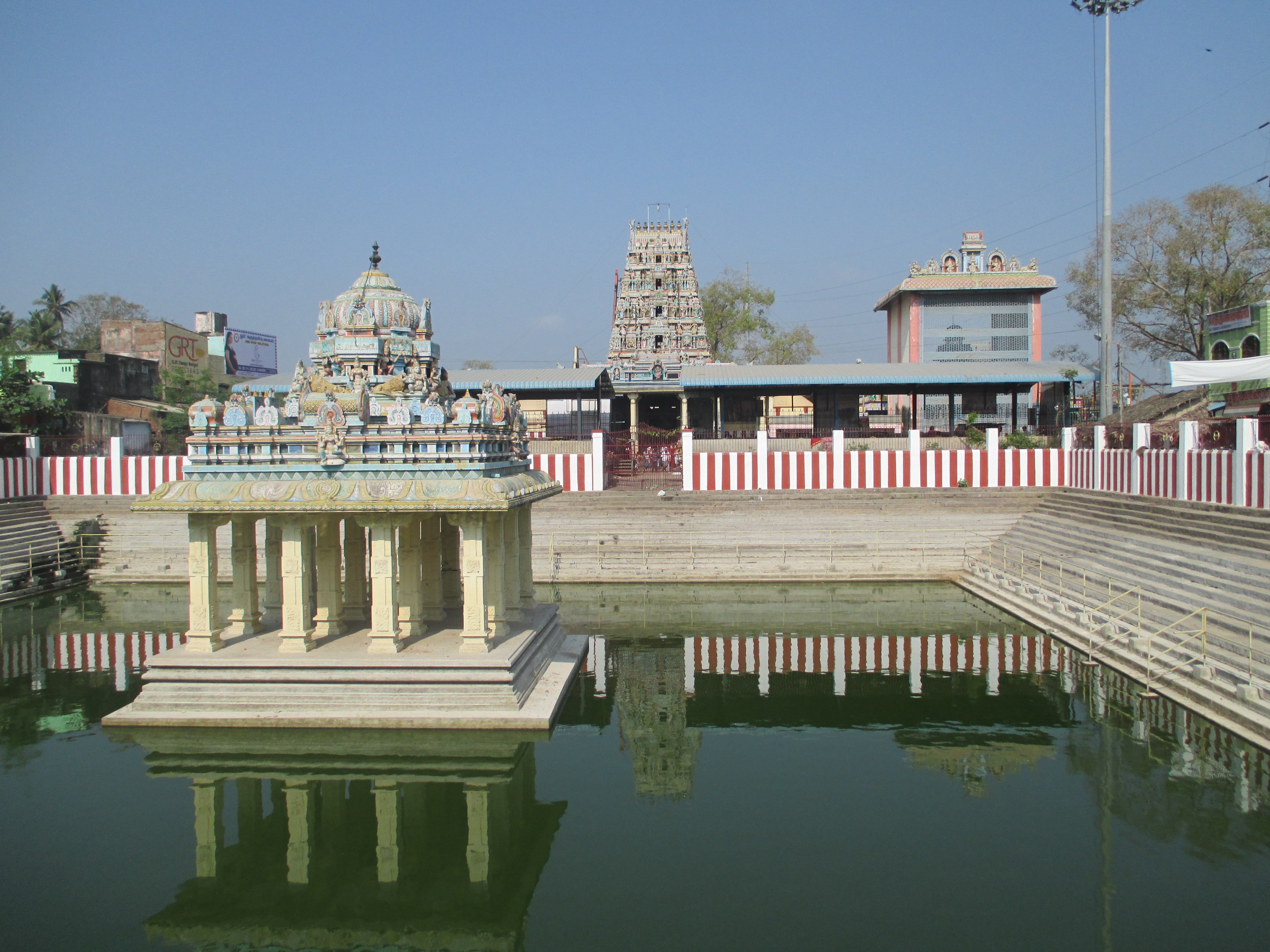
The holy tank of the temple

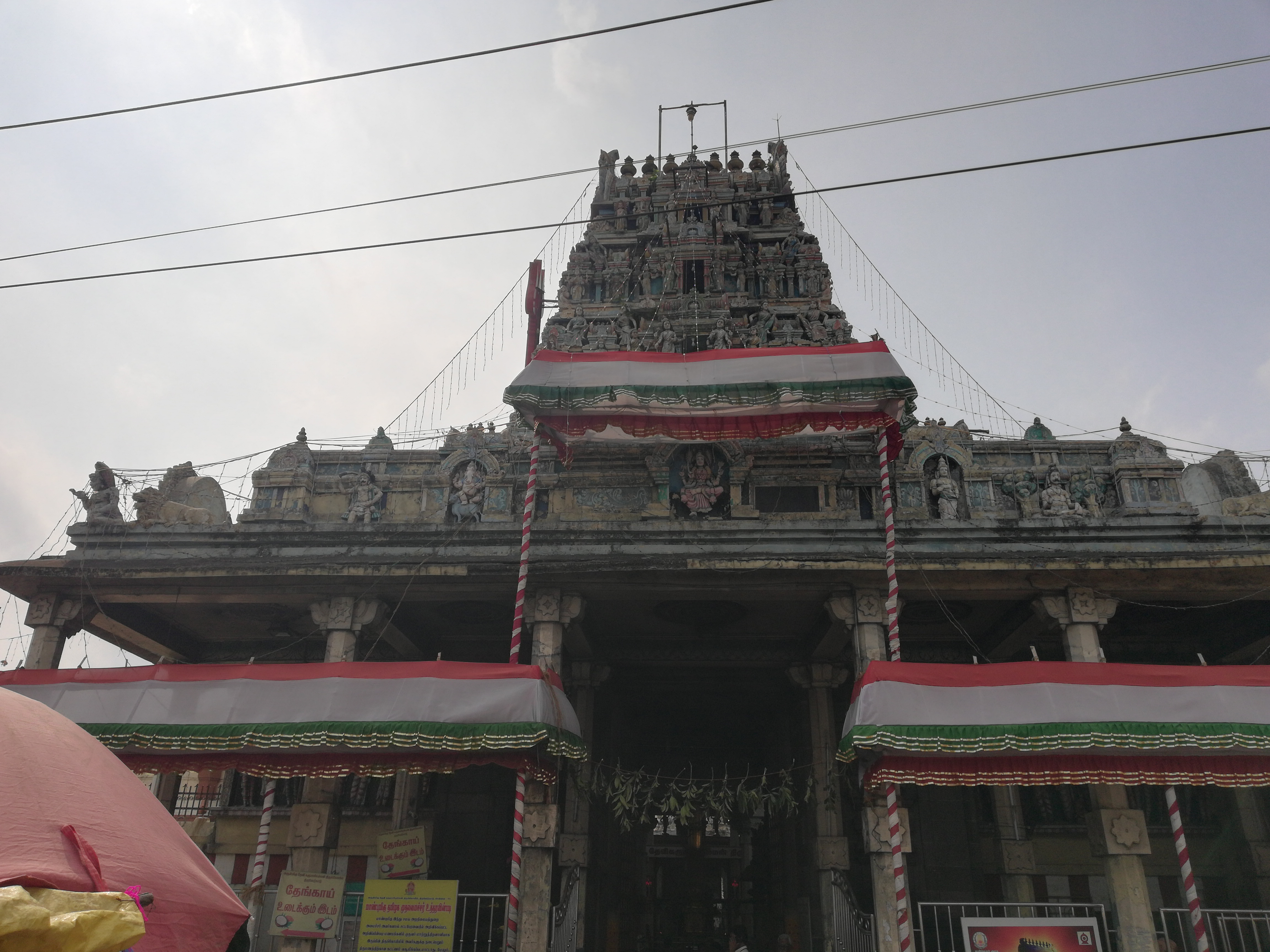
Rajagopuram of the temple

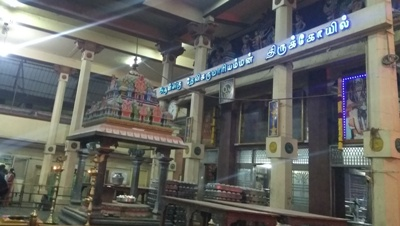
Front mandapa

During the Dwapara Yuga, tyrant king Kamsa, who ruled the northern part of the Indian subcontinent, gave his sister Devaki to Vasudeva in marriage. When he was sending the couple to Vasudeva's home, an oracle spoke from the sky informing Kamsa that the eighth child to be born to his sister would eventually kill him. On hearing this, Kamsa became furious and imprisoned Devaki and Vasudeva. Whenever a child was born to his sister, Kamsa would kill the newborn, and he succeeded in killing seven children. In Devaki's eighth pregnancy, Vishnu took his ninth avatar in the form of Krishna. At the same time, Vishnu's sister goddess Parvathi appeared in the form of Maya in the womb of Nanda Gopa's wife Yashoda, who was also pregnant in the village of Ayarpadi. When Devaki gave birth the male child Krishna and Yashoda to the female child Maya, Vasudeva swapped the infants with divine help. When Kamsa was informed of the birth of a girl child to Devaki, he decided to kill the girl child anyway. When he was about to strangle the child, the divine child jumped into the sky and hinted that her brother would come from a shepherd's hut in Ayarpadi and kill him at the age of eight. Furious and confused, Kamsa uttered "Karumari" (meaning “the one who swapped the womb”).

Karumari took on a fierce and terrifying form to subdue the demons and appeared in dark blue hue, planting a trident in front of her. Her fury was unbearable to the demons who eventually subdued. To pacify his sister, Vishnu appeared in front of the fierce Karumari and implored her to show her head alone and hide her body, hinting that her compassionate glance is enough to save the world. Karumari did so and additionally took a beautiful form for the devotees who came to worship her. The fierce form of Karumari, whom Vishnu appeased came to be known as "Narani" (meaning the female form of Narayana) and "Krishnamari" (since she swapped womb with Krishna), and the beautiful form came to be known as "Sivai" (meaning the female form of Shiva).

When Sage Agastya saw the goddess in this state with a double form, he sang in praise of her in high Tamil verses. The goddess appeared to Sage Agastya on a full moon day in the Tamil month of Thai which fell on a Sunday. This day of Pushya nakshatra (poosam in Tamil) is considered the incarnation day of goddess Karumari. Karumari said to Agastya that she was waiting for him to come and worship her and that she will take on the form of a snake and live in the forest, only to appear again in Kali Yuga to restore peace with ashes, when she will have a temple and a holy pond to reside with all her entourage of deities. In Kali Yuga, the goddess was found to be residing in an anthill under a neem tree in the “Velakadu” locality and a temple was built there, with a holy pond located directly opposite the temple. The idols of the goddess have been installed in the place where the anthill once stood. The anthill now remains in the north-eastern corner of the temple, with a trident adorned with turmeric and saffron installed on the spot.

== Future expansions ==
In August 2023, the Ministry for Hindu Religious and Charitable Endowments announced two projects worth around ₹ 800 million, one of which is building three new gopurams (towers) as part of the temple's consecration (kumbabishekam), expected to be completed within two years. One of the gopurams will have five tiers and two will have three tiers each.
