= Papanasam Dam =

Dam in Tamil Nadu, India

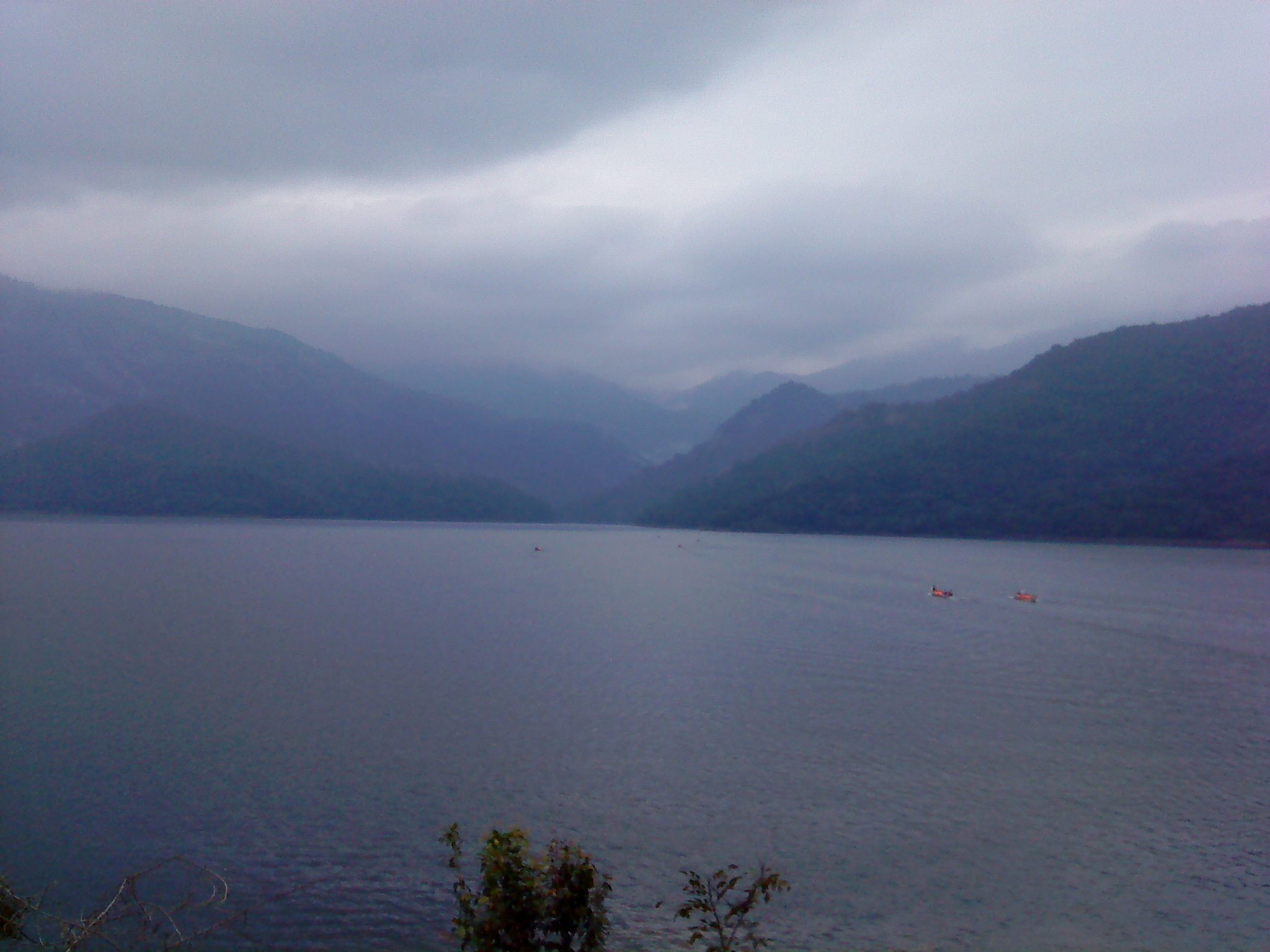

- Location of the Papanasam Dam in Tamil Nadu
- Country: India
- Location: Papanasam, Tirunelveli District, Tamil Nadu
- Coordinates: 8.712°N 77.393°E
- Opening date: 1942

Dam and spillways
- Type of dam: Gravity dam
- Height: 143 ft (44 m)
- Height (foundation): 200 ft (61 m)
- Length: 744 ft (227 m)

Reservoir
- Creates: Papanasam Reservoir
- Total capacity: 5.5×10^{9} cu ft (126,263 acre⋅ft) (5.5 tmc ft)

Power Station
- Operator: Tamil Nadu Green Energy Corporation Limited
- Commission date: Unit 1: 8 July 1944; Unit 2: 12 December 1944; Unit 3: 10 June 1945; Unit 4: 7 July 1951
- Turbines: 4 x 8 MW Francis-type
- Installed capacity: 32 MW

The Papanasam dam also known as Karaiyar Dam is located 49 kilometres (30 mi) away from Tirunelveli in Tamil Nadu, India. The dam is used to irrigate 86,107 acres (34,846 ha) of paddy fields in Tirunelveli and Tuticorin districts.

== Papanasam Hydroelectric Power Plant ==
Papanasam Hydroelectric Power Plant has a design capacity of 28 megawatts. It has four Francis turbine-generators. The first unit was commissioned in 1944 and the last in 1951. It is on Thambirabarani river. It is operated by Tamil Nadu Green Energy Corporation Limited.
