= Kizha Ambur railway station =

Railway station in Tamil Nadu, India

Kizha Ambur

General information
- Location: Tirunelveli district, Tamil Nadu; India
- Coordinates: 8°45′5″N 77°23′52″E
- Elevation: 90 metres (300 ft)
- System: Indian Railways station
- Owner: Southern Railway zone of the Indian Railways
- Platforms: 1
- Tracks: 1
- Connections: Auto rickshaw stand, Taxi stand

Construction
- Structure type: Standard (on-ground station)

Other information
- Status: Functioning
- Station code: KIB
- Zone(s): Southern Railway
- Division(s): Madurai
Route map
Location
- Location within India Location within Tamil Nadu

Kizha Ambur railway station belongs to the Madurai railway division in Southern Railway zone. The station code is KIB. This railway station is present between Alwarkurichi railway station and Ambasamudram.

Daily four passenger trains from Tirunelveli (TEN) to Senkottai (SCT) and four passenger trains from Senkottai to Tirunelveli halt at this station. The railway station caters to hamlets and villages like Poovankurichi, Kovankulam, Kizha Ambur, Karuthapillaiyur, Sivasailam, Agastiarpuram, and Mela Ambur.
