= Sivasailam Temple =

Shiva temple in Tenkasi district, Tamil Nadu, India

Sivasailanathar Paramakalyani Amman Kovil
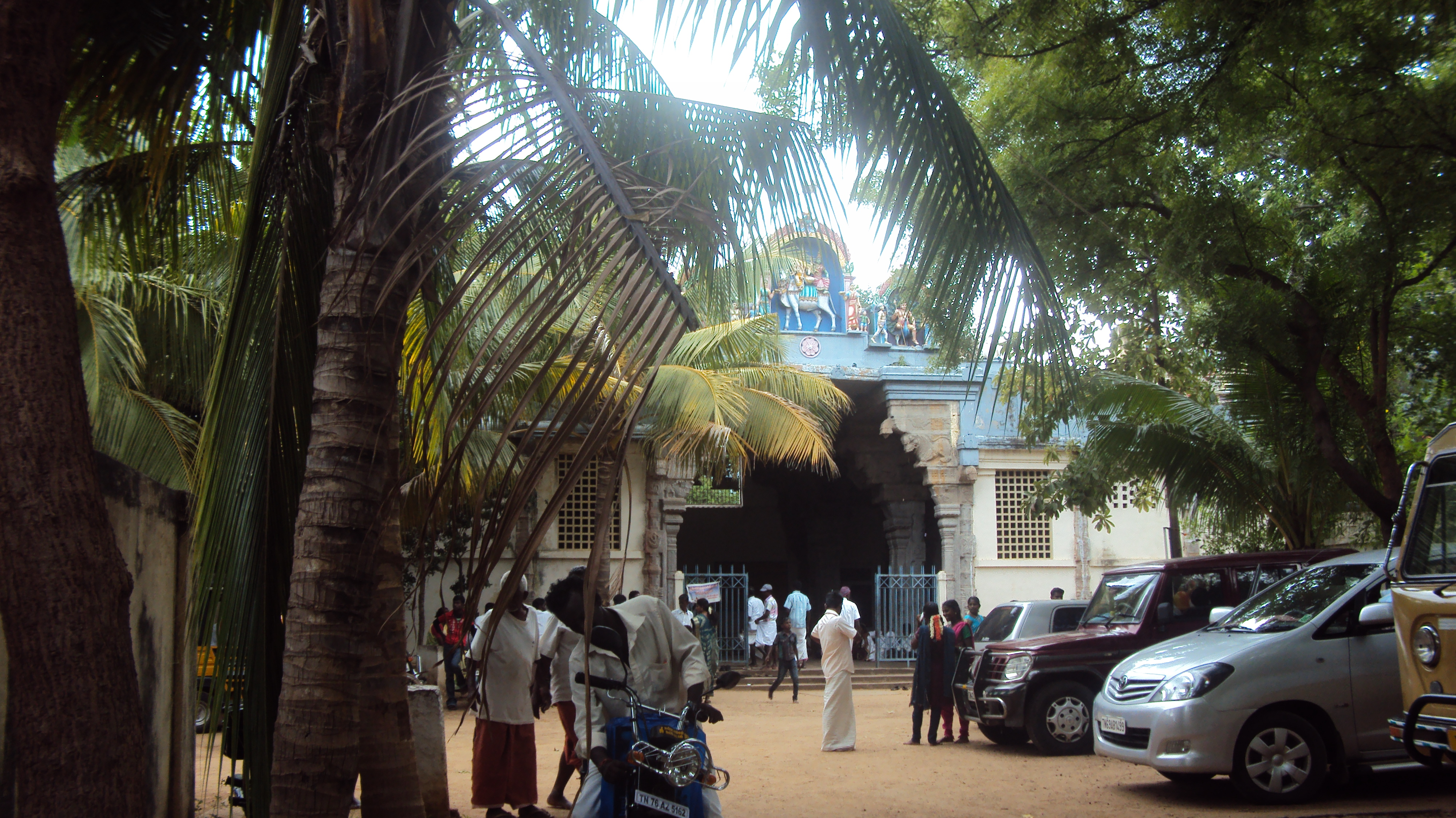

- Location in Tamil Nadu

Religion
- Affiliation: Hinduism
- District: Tenkasi
- Deity: Sivasailanathar (Shiva), Paramakalyani Amman (Parvathi)

Location
- Location: Sivasailam, Tenkasi
- State: Tamil Nadu
- Country: India
- Interactive map of Sivasailanathar Paramakalyani Amman Kovil
- Coordinates: 8°46′52″N 77°20′34″E

Architecture
- Type: Dravidian architecture

Website
- www.wbcsoftwarelab.com/sailapathiparamakalyani/about.html

Sivasailanathar Paramakalyani Amman Kovil, popularly known as Sivasailam Temple, is a Hindu temple in Sivasailam village of Tamil Nadu, India. It is located 3 miles from Alwarkurichi in Tenkasi District. It is "an old Siva temple of large size, well sculptured and containing inscriptions." Sivasailam is surrounded by Velli Malai (Silver Hill), Western Ghats and Mulli Malai, and is located beside the Gadananathi River. It is one of the shrines of the Vaippu Sthalams.

== Religious significance ==
=== Appearance of Shivalingam ===
It is told that a landlord had many cows in his house. Usually, he made his labourers milk the cows, but one day all the cows refused to give milk. The labourers complained about this leading the owner to get angry and he chased all his cows and labourers from his house. All the cows gathered on a hill with a rock upon it and flooded their milk upon the rock. On the place of this flooding of milk a shivalingam appeared. He is known as Sivasailanathar. Sivasailanathar is the main god for the temple.

=== Sivasailanathar saved a priest ===
It is told (by whom?) that once a pandya king came to the temple and received prasadam from the priest. The priest gave him a garland in which there was a hair. The king got angry with the priest. However, as the priest was pure and truly devoted to Sivasailanathar, Sivasailanathar thought to save the priest and he sent a vision to the king to not get angry with the priest and gave him a vision of shivalingam. The king became very happy.

== Architecture ==
=== Statue of Shivasailanathar ===
- The statue is said to have been made without any touch of chisel. The statue of Suyambuligam (Shivan) is said to have been formed naturally.
- At the back of the statue, there are lines that appear like hair, so he is also called Sadaiappar.

=== Tower statues and ritual pavilions ===
- The Vimana is spectacularly gilded.
- The main gopuram has five floors and is adorned with many statues.
- In the south direction of the temple, there is an east facing statue of Vinayagar.
- In the north direction, a statue of the Tamil God Murugan is placed.
- In the south direction, 63 Nayanmars statue and Suriyan and Chandran statues are placed, and a statue of Dakshinamurthy facing south is placed.
- The temple has a number of mandapam (ritual pavilions) for Nartha, Maa, Aartha and Mani.
- the distance between the statues of Sivasailanathar (Shiva) and his consort Paramakalyani Amman Sannithi (Parvathi) is nearly 15 feet.
- The statue of Paramakalyani Amman (Mother Paramakalyani) with emerald green cheeks gives grace to devotees.
- In the south of Mani mandapam, a statue of Nadaraja Perumal is placed.

=== Statue of Nandi ===
The representation of Nandi in the temple is particularly noted. Nandikeshvarar statue looks like an ox sitting upon its folded tail. This statue demonstrates the special character of Tamil and the artistic work of the artist.

== Stone inscriptions ==
- Stone Inscription no.519 of Sivasailam Temple was found in Poovankurichi lake in 1916. The inscription tells that Jamindars of Ambur, Alwarkurichi, Kadayam, Krishnapuram, Poovankurichi collected tax from people for god.
- In 1916 another inscription was found in Kizha Ambur. It is Stone Inscription no.518 and tells about King Ravivarman.

== Manimandapam ==
A manimandapam (memorial) is located on the bank of the river Gadananathi.

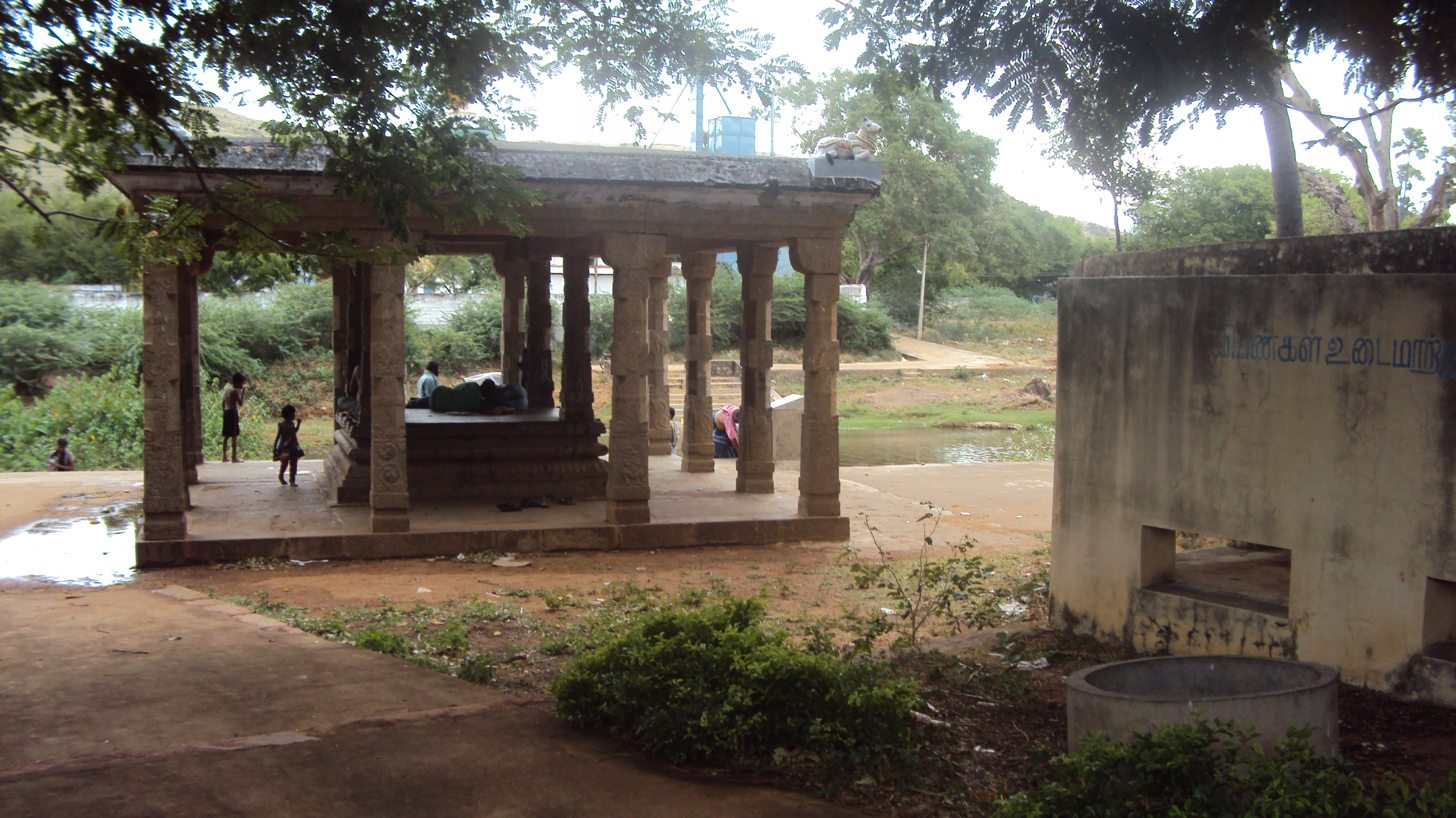
Mani mandapam on the banks of river in Sivasailam

== Sculpture among the pillars ==
- In the pillars of the mandapam, a lion crest or sculpture is seen.
- On the inner side of the pandal mandapam many coloured flowers are depicted.
- The temple has two wooden chariots, one is large and the other is small. The large chariot is for Sivasailanathar and the smaller is for his consort, Amman.
