= Brahmadesam (Ambasamudram) =

Coordinates: 8.732049°N 77.446092°E

Brahmadesam is a village in Ambasamudram Taluk of Thirunelveli District in Tamil Nadu (India). This village was the Taluk Headquarters till 1850 or so, now only a small village. This is a very fertile village benefitted by Thamarabharani and Ghatna River. This is the birthplace of Sri Sarvagna Atmendra Saraswathi Swamigal, the second Acharya of Sri Kanchi Kamakodi Peetam. Brahmadesam is very famous for the ancient Shri Kailasanathar Temple of lord Shiva.

== History ==
Brahmadesam Kailasanathar Temple is the first of navakailasa temples (according to cuRRAla mahAtmIyam) in the region.

The original deity in Shri Kailasanathar Temple, Badhari Vaneswara was worshipped by Romasa Maharishi, the grandson of Lord Brahma, the Creator and so the village was named Brahmadesam. In the Ghatana Nadhi Mahatmiam it is mentioned that the Swayambu Lingams of Sivasailam, Thiruvaleeswaram and Kailasanathar emerged in the same time and those who take bath in the Gadananathi River and worship the above lingas get freed from the sins. In the sixth Thirumurai, this temple is mentioned as Ayneeswaram in the 8th Verse of 71st Chapter.

Originally the temple was constructed during the reign of King Raja Raja Chola. During the reign of Emperor Raja Raja Chola this village was donated for Vedic Scholars for chanting Four Vedas and hence named as Chaturveda Mangalam or Brahmadhayam. Subsequent additions were constructed by Pandya Kings and [Hoysala] Kings. Big compound walls and front Rajagopuram of 7 stories and the back Gopuram of 5 stories were constructed by King Viswanatha Naick, who was ruling from Tirunelveli.

== Specialities ==
Brahmadesam Kailasanathar Temple is very big, ancient and rich in sculptural wealth.

There are five siva lingas with separate Sanctum sanctorum in the temple namely

1. Sri. Kailasanathar
2. Sri Badari Vaneswarar
3. Sri Viswanathar with Sri Visalakshi
4. Sri Arunachaleswarar with Unnamalai
5. Sri Sundareswarar with Sri Meenakshi.
6. Sri Nadikeswara
7. Sri Nataraja (Punuku Sabhapathi)
8. Sri Athma Vyakya dhakshinamoorthy with chin mudra facing His ownself and Jwarahara Deva are certain examples of the iconographic treasures of the temple.

Pradosha Sabhai with Pradosha Moorthy, Ashta Dik Balakas with their respective Vahanas, Siva Boothaganas and Apsaras women is a very rare specimen of deities. Chandikeswari goddess Saraswathi and Uchchishta Ganapathy are seen in the Praakara of the goddess Brahannayaki's shrine. The Arudra Mandapam is an example of Architectural Excellence. The Dharma Nandhi is of a very big size made in a single stone carved with magnificent skill.

There are separate sannidhis for Vigneswara, Subrahmanya, Dharma Sastha, Balamurugan, Surya, Chandra, Dhakshinamoorthy and Navukkarasar, Appar & Sundarar. The big doors of the main entrance with wooden carvings and wood sculptures inside the temple are proving that artisans from Kerala were taking active rolls in this temple. The Somawara Mandapam is another masterpiece of the sculptors of that age. Many more details can be seen when one pays a visit to the temple.

== See also ==
- Mannarkovil, an ancient temple town
- Ambasamudram, an ancient temple town
- Thiruppudaimarudur, an ancient temple town
- Veeravanallur, an ancient temple town
