= Ramanathi River =

Location
- Country: India
- State: Tamil Nadu
- District: Tenkasi district
- Cities: Tenkasi

Physical characteristics
- Source: Agasthyamala Biosphere Reserve, Pothigai Hills
- Mouth
  - location: Kizha ambur
- Length: 23 km (14 mi)
- Discharge
  - location: Kizha Ambur

Basin features
- Tributaries
  - left: Thekkar

Ramanathi (ராமாநதி) is a river flowing in the Tenkasi of the Indian state of Tamil Nadu.Gadananathi originates from Agasthyamalai Biosphere Reserve.This river enters Gadananathi River in Kizha Ambur. The Ramanadhi has 7 anicuts, a reservoir of 4,300,000 cubic metres (3,500 acre⋅ft), and irrigates 20.23 square kilometres (7.81 mi^{2}) of wetlands. This river flows on many villages like Alwarkurichi, Ravanasamudram, Pottalpudur, Pillaukulam.The Gadananathi is fed by Thekkaru and Ramanathi Rivers.This was proposed and opened by Karunanithi.

== Ramanathi Dam ==
Ramanathi reservoir is located at the foot of the Western ghats in Kadayam village of Kadayam Taluk in Tenkasi District. It is one of tourist place in this district. Now a lot of tourists are visiting the dam and park.

== See also ==
List of rivers of Tamil Nadu
