= Kovankulam =

- hamlet
- Location in Tamil Nadu, India Kovankulam (India)
- Coordinates: 8.754°N 77.396°E
- Country: India
- State: Tamil Nadu
- District: Tirunelveli
- Elevation: 90 m (300 ft)

Languages
  - Official: Tamil
- Time zone: UTC+5:30 (IST)
- PIN: 627418
- Telephone code: (91)4634
- Vehicle registration: TN-76, TN-72
- Website: municipality.tn.gov.in/Tirunelveli

Kovankulam is a hamlet in the district of Tirunelveli near Ambasamudram, Tamil Nadu, India. The spoken language in this area is Tamil.This village is located on Ambur-Papanasam Road.

== Geography ==
The area is surrounded by many lakes and a canal but it is mainly surrounded by mountains and hills which are part of the Western Ghats. The village has many paddy fields, mango orchards, vegetable gardens, palm trees and tall coconut trees. The village is located 50 km west of Tirunelveli town. Surrounding villages and hamlets include: Poovankurichi, Ambur, and Thattan Patti.

== Transport ==
Nearest Railway station is Kizha Ambur(0.75 km). Both bus and train are major transportation.

== Climate ==
The place will be greenish even during the summer months. During the month of Chitirai (mid April) to Puratasi (mid October) wind from the mountains blows gently and rain sprinkles and makes the place cool.
