= Sambankulam =

- Village
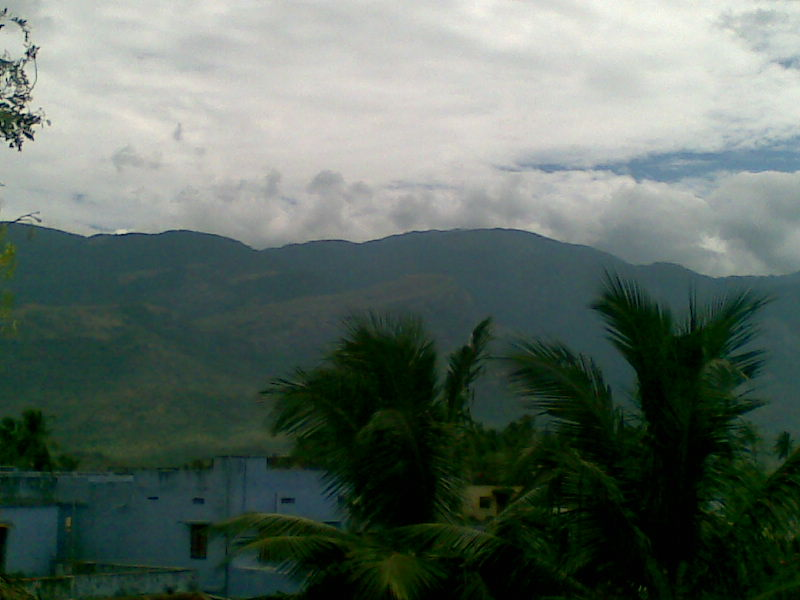
- Sambankulam

- Location in Tamil Nadu, India Sambankulam (India)
- Coordinates: 8.7931°N 77.3408°E
- Country: India
- State: Tamil Nadu
- District: Tirunelveli
- Elevation: 102 m (335 ft)

Languages
  - Official: Tamil
- Time zone: UTC+5:30 (IST)
- PIN: 627412
- Telephone code: (91)4634
- Vehicle registration: TN-76, TN-72
- Website: municipality.tn.gov.in/Tirunelveli

Sambankulam is a village in District of Tirunelveli.The spoken language in this area is Tamil.Sambankulam is located on the bank of Gadananathi River (Kadana Nadi), which means "kadana dam river" and flows throughout the year. The area is surrounded by mountains and hills which are part of the Western Ghats. Sambankulam is located between two tourist spots: Sivasailam temple 2 km from the village.and Gadananathi River dam, 3 km from the village. The village has many paddy fields, mango orchards, vegetable gardens, palm trees and tall coconut trees.

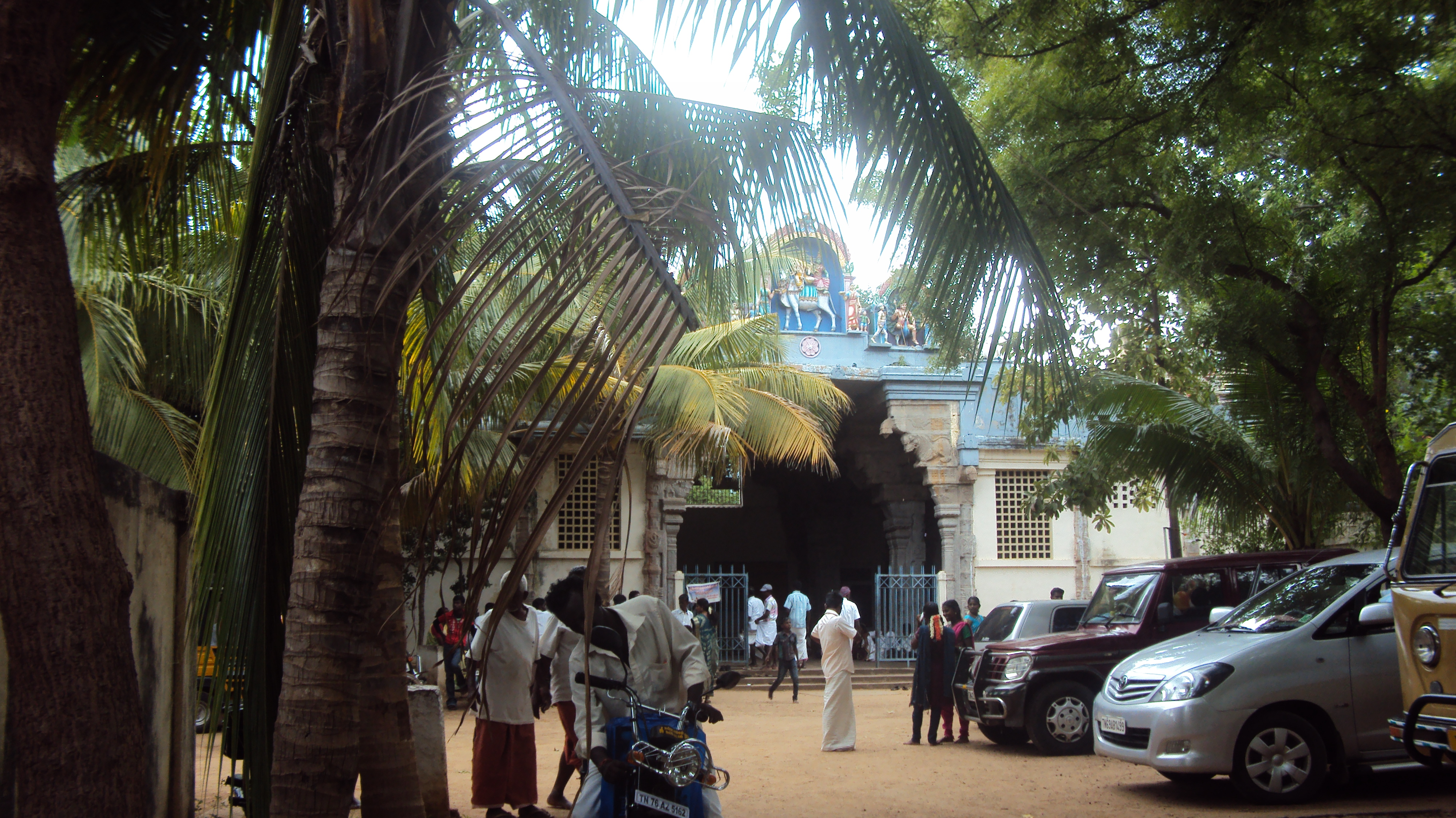
Sivasailam Temple

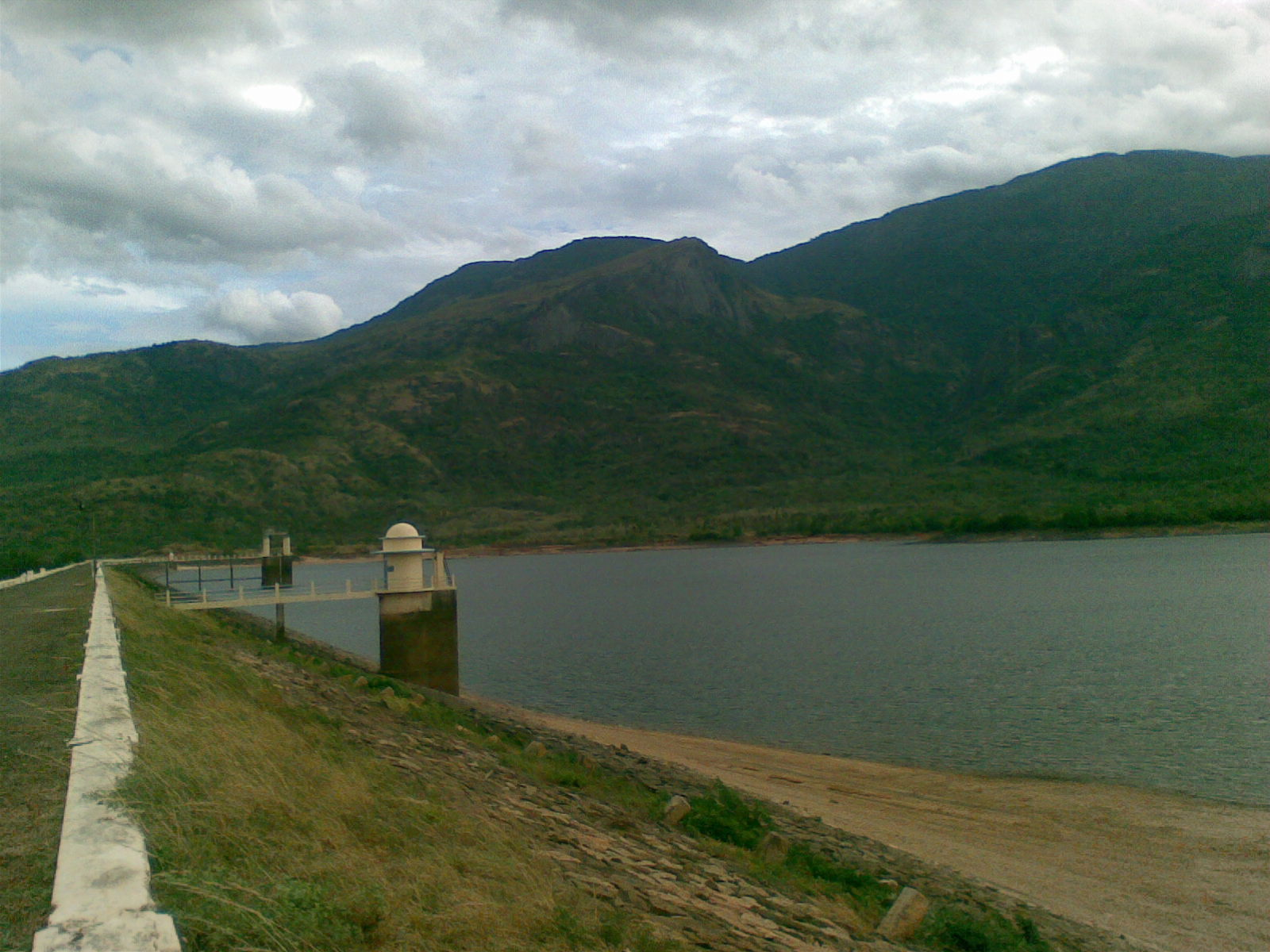
Gadana nadi or Karunai river dam

== Transportation ==
Bus and train are the major transport methods. The nearest railway station is in Alwarkurichi, 5 km from the village.

== Climate ==
The place will be greenish even during the summer months. During the month of Chitirai (mid April) to Puratasi (mid October) wind from the mountains blows gently and rain sprinkles and makes the place cool.
