= Sivanthipuram =

- Town
- Location in Tamil Nadu, India
- Coordinates: 8°41′34″N 77°24′26″E
- Country: India
- State: Tamil Nadu
- District: Tirunelveli

Population (2011)
  - Total: 14,281

Languages
  - Official: Tamil
- Time zone: UTC+5:30 (IST)

Sivanthipuram is a panchayat town in Tirunelveli district in the Indian state of Tamil Nadu.

== Demographics ==
As per the 2011 India census, Sivanthipuram had a population of 14,281 (49% male, 51% female). Sivanthipuram had an average literacy rate of 90.31%, higher than the state average of 80.09% and the national average of 74.04%. Male literacy was 94.78% and female literacy was 85.90%. 8.84% of the population was under 6 years of age.

The nearest railway station is at Ambasamudram, 4 kilometres (2.5 mi).
