= Ambasamudram railway station =

Railway station in Tamil Nadu, India

Ambasamudram

General information
- Location: Tirunelveli district, Tamil Nadu; India
- Coordinates: 8°42′28″N 77°26′19″E
- Elevation: 80 metres (260 ft)
- System: Indian Railway Station
- Owner: Southern Railway zone of the Indian Railways
- Operator: Southern Railway
- Platforms: 3
- Tracks: 3
- Connections: Auto rickshaw stand, taxi stand

Construction
- Structure type: Standard (on ground station)

Other information
- Status: Functioning
- Station code: ASD
- Zone(s): Southern Railway
- Division(s): Madurai

Services
Preceding station	Indian Railways	Following station
Kallidaikurichi towards ?	Madurai railway division	Kizha Ambur towards ?
Route map
Location
- Location within India Location within Tamil Nadu

Ambasamudram railway station (station code: ASD) is an NSG–5 category Indian railway station in Madurai railway division of Southern Railway zone. It has automated ticket vending. This railway station is present between Kizha Ambur and Kallidaikurichi.

== Projects and development ==
It is one of the 73 stations in Tamil Nadu to be named for upgradation under Amrit Bharat Station Scheme of Indian Railways.It was Recently Inuagrated By Prime Minister Shri Narendra Modi On 11 October 2026
