= Thiruppudaimarudur =

Village in Tamil Nadu, India

Thiruppudaimarudhur is a village situated near Veeravanallur in Tirunelveli District, Tamil Nadu, India.

== Description ==
Thiruppudaimarudur is unique because of its history. The Jyotirlinga in Srisailam, Andhra Pradesjh is considered as head of Shiva. The temple in Thiruvidaimarudur (idai in Tamil means middle) is considered as the body, and Thiruppudaimarudur as the foot. If one could see the Shiva in Thiruppudaimarudur, one would get the benefit of visiting Srisailam and Thiruvidaimarudur. Only these three temples have the Marudhu tree as Sthala Vriksha. Also Brahmadhand can be seen inside the temple.

== History ==
There was a king called Surendra who killed another king in a battle. He was affected by the sin and wanted to get rid of it. He meditated Shiva. Shiva gave him a Brahmadhand and told him that this will go to sea and get back to land, wherever it stops, you build a temple. He built the temple. Also the Lord asked him to travel to the Himalayas to search for a statue of Gomathi Maa. He did search and found which was completely made of Rudraksha. With that, he completed building the temple. He bathed in Thamirabharani river near the temple and got salvation. This is called "Surendara Moksha Theertham". It is believed that if one takes bath there, all sorts of sins are dissolved including "Brahmahathi dhosha".

During the Tamil month of Thai (15 January to 15 February) the Theerthavaari Festival is celebrated in Thaipoosam.

== Nearby places of interest ==
There is hospital called Mayopathy in the nearby city of Veeravanallur nearby, which treats diseases that cannot be cured by modern medicine.

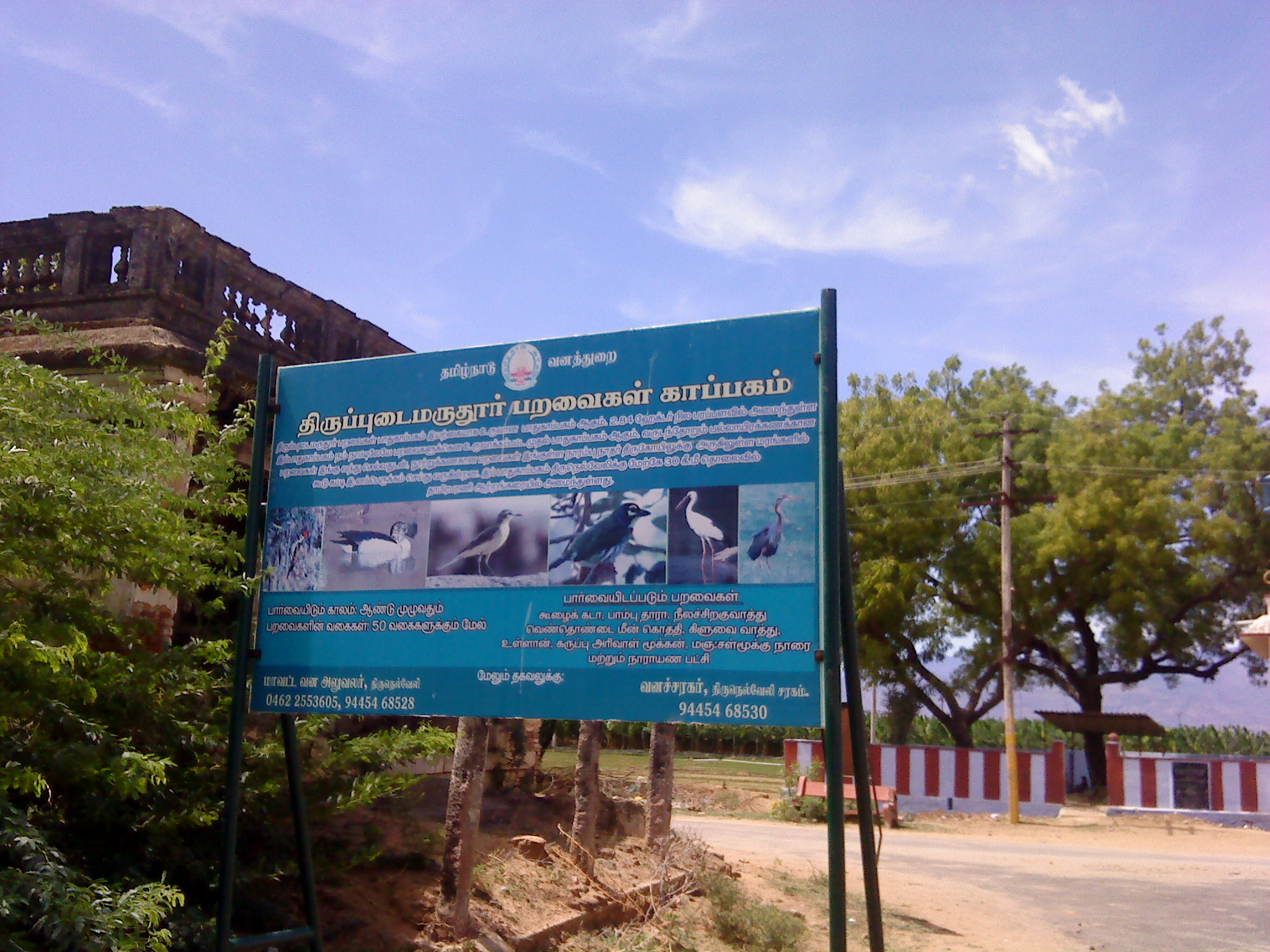
Birds sanctuary approved by Tamil Nadu government

Other places of interest include Navathiruppadhi and NavaKailasam.

There are dams - Manimuthar, Karaiyar - lower and upper dams.

Other natural features include falls, such as Agasthiyar, Kutralam, and Paanatheertham and hills- Papanasam, Maanjolai, Kodhaiyar, Agasthiyar hill.

Also, Kalakkadu tiger reservoir is nearby. This village has a conservation reserve planned.

== See also ==
- Mannarkovil, an ancient temple town
- Brahmadesam, an ancient temple town
- Ambasamudram, an ancient temple town
- Veeravanallur, an ancient temple town
- Thiruvidaimarudur
