= Karuthapillaiyur =

- Village
- Location in Tamil Nadu, India Karuthapillaiyur (India)
- Coordinates: 8.7691°N 77.3651°E
- Country: India
- State: Tamil Nadu
- District: Tenkasi
- Elevation: 90 m (300 ft)

Languages
  - Official: Tamil
- Time zone: UTC+5:30 (IST)
- PIN: 627418
- Telephone code: (91)4634
- Vehicle registration: TN-76, TN-72
- Website: municipality.tn.gov.in/Tenkasi

Karuthapillaiyur is a village in the district of Tenkasi near Ambasamudram, Tamil Nadu, India.

== Etymology ==
The name Karuthapillayur is an evolution from the mixing of three words "Karthar" "Pillai" "oor". "Karthar pillai oor" means village in Tamil. The name of the village roughly translated to 'Village of God's Child"

== Geography ==
The village is located 30 km south of Tenkasi town. This village is surrounded by many villages and hamlets like Poovankurichi, Sivasailam, Mela Ambur, and Kalyanipuram. The spoken language in this area is Tamil. Karuthapillaiyur is located on the bank of Kadananathi River (Kadana Nadi). The area is surrounded by mountains and hills which are part of the Western Ghats. The village has many paddy fields, mango orchards, vegetable gardens, palm trees and tall coconut trees.

== Transportation ==
Bus and train are the major transport methods. The nearest railway station is in Kizha Ambur, 5 km from the village. Another railway station is in Alwarkurichi, 7.5 km from the village.
