= Murder of Clement De La Haye =

1919 unsolved murder in India

Clement De La Haye
- Died: 15 October 1919; Madras, British India (present-day Chennai, India)
- Cause of death: Ballistic trauma
- Occupation: Principal of Newington House college
- Known for: Victim of an unsolved murder

On the night of 15 October 1919, Clement De La Haye, the principal of Newington House, a college in Madras (now known as Chennai), India was murdered. It led to a highly sensationalized trial known as the De La Haye murder case or Madras murder case. No one was convicted and the case remains unsolved.

== Events ==
On the night of 15 October 1919, De La Haye, the principal of Newington House was shot dead in his bed. The Newington House was a school of the Court of Wards which attended to the educational requirements of minor princes of the various princely states of British India. By an order of the Government of India under section 27 of the Criminal Procedure Code, the case was transferred from the Madras High Court to the Bombay High Court. Various motives were assigned to the murder. However, in the end, the main accused was acquitted. The case remains unsolved to this day.

== Suspects ==
Various motives have been assigned to the murder. According to eyewitnesses, the boys at the house were frequently offended by De La Haye's racist remarks as he often addressed them as "barbarous Tamilians". There were also rumours that some of the boys in the college were seduced by De La Haye's wife.

As the trial progressed, one of the conspirators, the heir to the Singampatti estate turned approved. He gave a detailed description of the events of the night.

Kadambur said, "We must finish the Dorai (principal) tonight. "Mr. and Mrs. De la Haye returned to the school between 20:30 and 21:00. Mr. De la Haye greeted the boys in the hall, bade them good night and went upstairs to his bed-room. There were two beds on the verandah of the first floor just over the porch of the building. Under the porch was the hard carriage drive of the school compound. Mr. and Mrs. De la Haye went to bed after a time, Mr. De la Haye sleeping in one bed and his wife sleeping in the other bed alongside, on the verandah. De la Haye soon fell fast asleep. About 30 minutes past midnight, someone entered the bedroom, approached the bed on which De la Haye was sleeping, and shot him dead with a 12-bore gun. De la Haye died instantaneously, having been hit by the bullet on the right side of his head. As the judge pointed out in his admirable charge to the Jury, this was unquestionably a case of murder, there being no suggestion or possibility of accident or suicide. Mrs. De la Haye was alarmed by the sound of the gun and so were several boys. One of the boys came down and finding what had happened, immediately telephoned to the police and the Civil Surgeon, Major Hingston. Major Hingston arrived in about 10 minutes, examined Mr. De la Haye and found him dead. Mrs. De la Haye was naturally in a hysterical state of mind. The Police came, inquiries were made; and it was found that another gun was lying on the carriage-drive below with a few cartridges placed around it

== Aftermath ==
Based on Singampatti's testimony, the heir to the Kadambur estate was implicated in the murder. However, on detailed scrutiny, the jury found Singampatti's version of the events to be false. Kadambur was eventually acquitted.

The Newington House was closed shortly after the murder.

== See also ==
- List of unsolved murders (1900–1979)
