= Rengasamudram =

- village
- Location in Tamil Nadu, India Rengasamudram (India)
- Coordinates: 10°N 78°E
- Country: India
- State: Tamil Nadu
- District: Tirunelveli
- Taluka: Ambasamudram

Population (2011)
  - Total: 2,381

Languages
  - Official: Tamil
- Time zone: UTC+5:30 (IST)

Rengasamudram is a village near Bhramadesom in Ambasamudram taluka in Tirunelveli district in the state of Tamil Nadu, India. The population was 2,381 at the 2011 Indian census.
