= Sivasailam =

- Village
- Location within Tamil Nadu Location within India
- Coordinates: 8°46′52″N 77°20′34″E
- Country: India
- State: Tamil Nadu
- District: Tenkasi
- Subdistrict: Tenkasi
- Time zone: UTC+05:30 (IST)
- Pincode: 627412
- Vehicle registration: TN76
- Website: www.wbcsoftwarelab.com/sailapathiparamakalyani/about.html

Sivasailam (Sivasaailam per the Indian census) is a village located on the bank of River Gadananathi River in Tenkasi taluk, Tenkasi district, Tamil Nadu, India. The census village code is 642940. The postal code is 627412. The spoken language in this area is Tamil.

== Climate ==
The place is greenish even during the summer months. During the month of Chitirai (mid April) to Puratasi (mid October) wind from the mountains blows gently and rain sprinkles and makes the place cool.

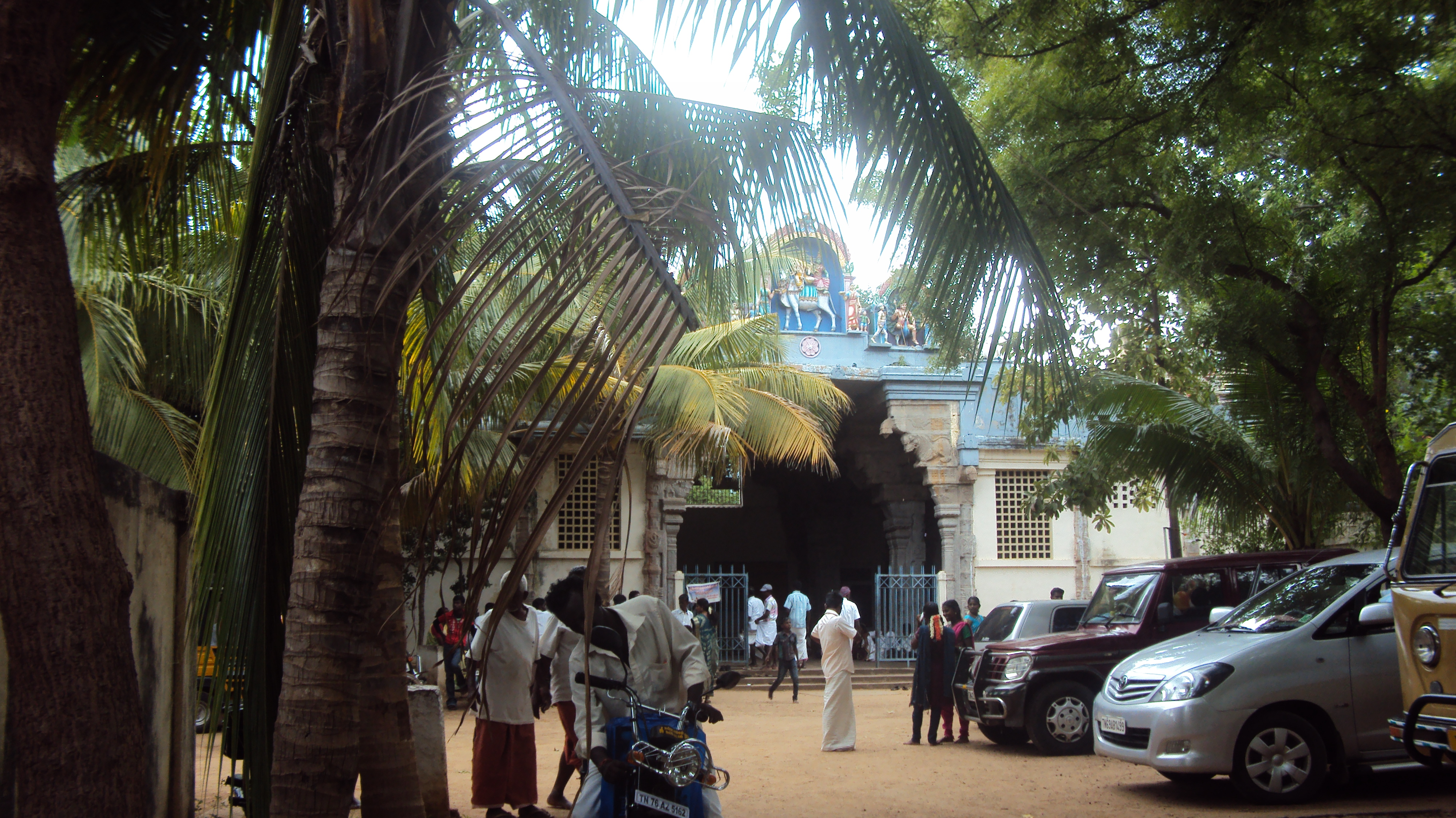
Sivasailam Temple

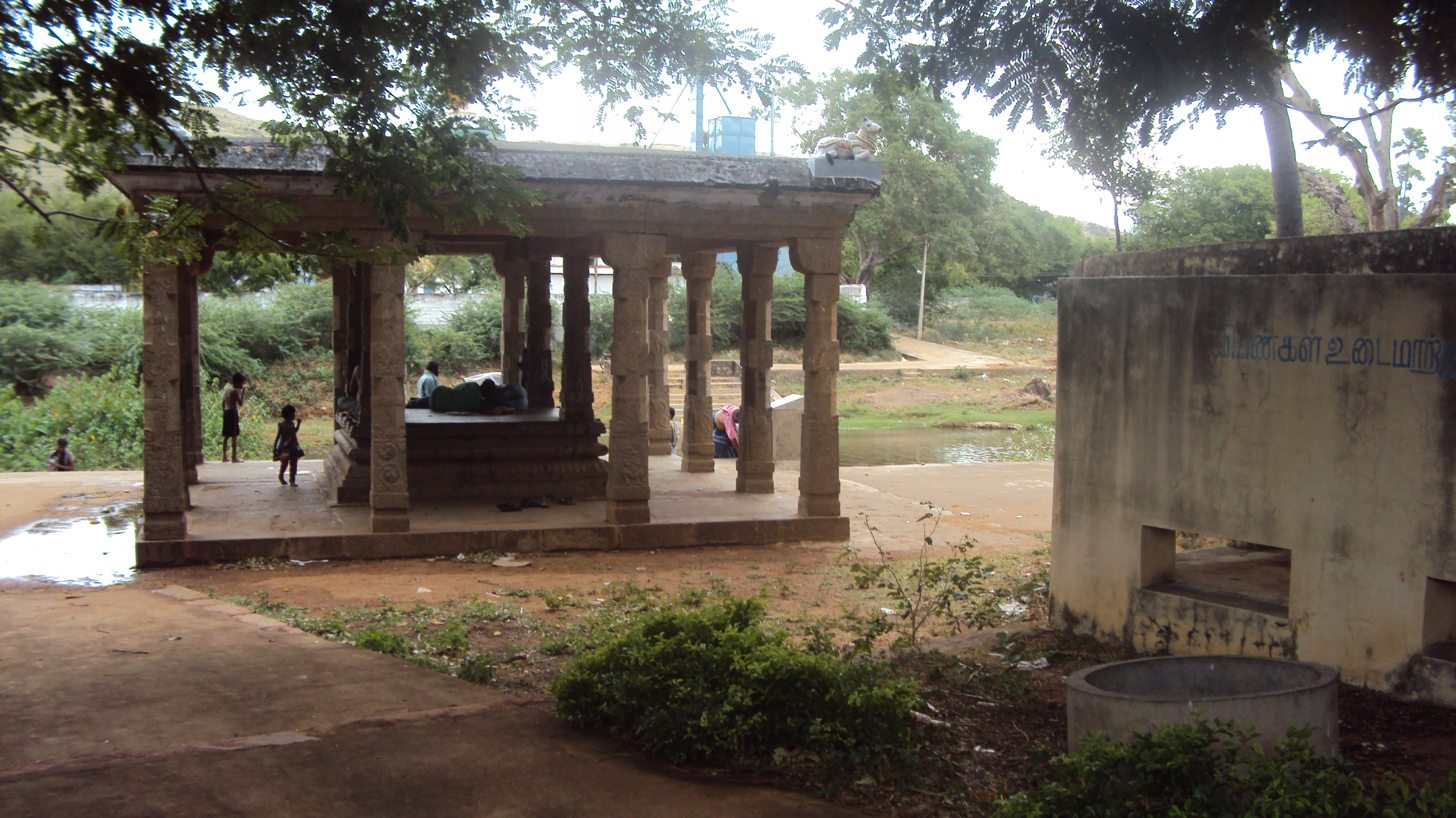
Mani Mandapam on the banks of river in Sivasailam.

== Temple ==
Within the village, there is an ancient Shiva temple named Sivasailanathar Temple. The main God of the temple is Sivasailanathar (a form of God Shiva) and his consort is Goddess Paramakalyani Amman, a form of Goddess Parvathi Amma. The temple is located on the bank of River Gadananathi River (Karunai River). The village is surrounded by Velli malai, Mulli malai and Podhigai hills, and these hills and the hill-forests are the special places of the God and Goddess.

=== Stone inscriptions ===
This temple was built by pandya king. It is confirmed by many sources including stone inscriptions. There are many stone inscriptions inside and near the temple and all are written in "Old Tamil." In the year 1916, a new Stone Inscription was found in Kizha Ambur. It is Stone Inscription no.518 and tells about King Ravivarman. Another inscription of Sivasailam Temple (Stone Inscription no.519) was found in Poovankurichi lake in 1916. The Stone Inscription tells that the Jamindars of Ambur, Alwarkurichi, Kadayam, Krishnapuram and Poovankurichi are responsible for collecting the tax from people and giving to the temple. The inscription says that these villages are the property of the God and the temple and the Jamindars will give the collected tax to the temple.

== How to reach ==
- By train: The nearest Railway station is Alwarkurichi
- By road: The route from Ambasamudram is like this: Ambasamudram – Kizha Ambur – Poovankurichi – Karuthapillaiyur – Sivasailam (19.3 km), or alternatively, Ambasamudram – Alwarkurichi – Chettikulam – Sivasailam (20 km)
