= Seeniyapuram =

Coordinates: 9.61306439°N 77.902651°E

- village
- Interactive map of Seeniyapuram
- Country: India
- State: Tamil Nadu

Languages
  - Official: Tamil
- Time zone: UTC+5:30 (IST)

Seeniyapuram is a village within Veeravanallur, in the Tirunelveli district of Tamil Nadu. The population of the village is approximately 1000. It was first recorded as a village in a 1924 list of villages in the Madras Presidency.
