= Ambasamudram =

Ambasamudram Ambai
- Town
- Location in Tamil Nadu, India
- Coordinates: 8.709300°N 77.453000°E
- Country: India
- State: Tamil Nadu
- District: Tirunelveli

Government
  - Type: Second Grade Municipality
  - Body: Ambasamudram Municipality
  - Chairman: Mrs. Selvi (2012- Till Date)
- Elevation: 93 m (305 ft)

Population (2011)
  - Total: 35,645

Languages
  - Official: Tamil
- Time zone: UTC+5:30 (IST)
- PIN: 627401
- Telephone code: (91)4634
- Vehicle registration: TN-72
- Website: municipality.tn.gov.in/Ambasamudram

Ambasamudram is the principal town of the Ambasamudram taluk in Tirunelveli district in the state of Tamil Nadu, India. The entire taluk had a population of 392,226 as of 2001, with 42.5% classified as rural. The town of Ambasamudram had a population 35,645 as of 2011.

The Thirumulanathar temple is located in Ambasamudram, on Melapalayam street. Kasibanathaswami Temple is another ancient temple of Ambasamudram which has a history of more than 2000 years.

The historical names of this town are "Thiru Salai Thurai", Velakuruichi, Ilangoykkudi and Raja Raja Sathurvedi Mangalam.

== Geography ==
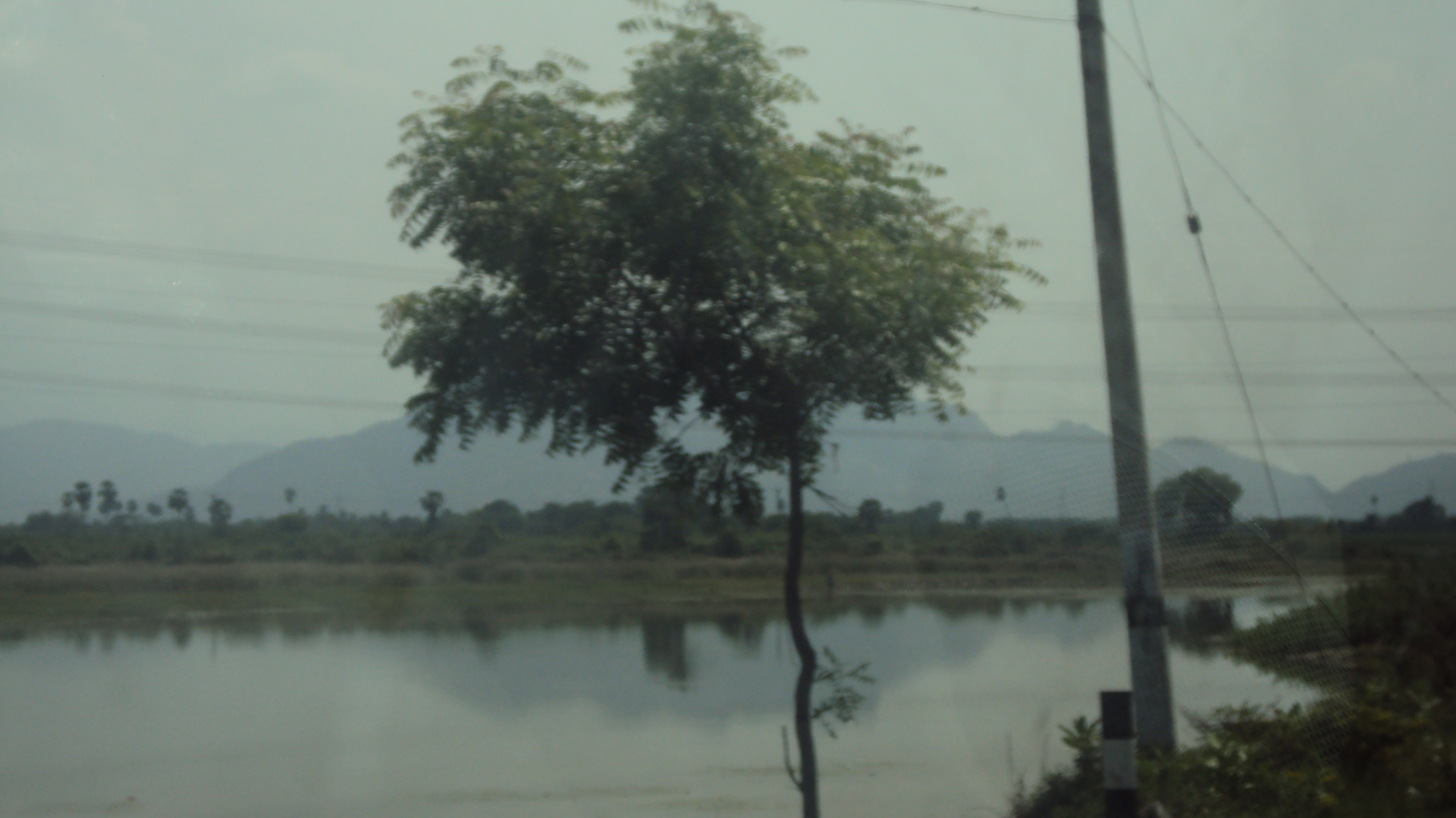
Podhigai mountain's shadow falling on Poovankurichi lake, Ambasamudram

This town is situated in the foothills of western ghats on the northern bank of Thamirabarani (Tamiram = copper, it contains traces of copper) river with a twin town Kallidaikurichi/Kallidai is situated on the southern bank.

=== Tamiraparni River ===
The Thamirabarani River or Tamiraparni, flows through Kallidaikurichi & Ambasamudram. Originating from the Pothigai malai (also known as Agasthiyamalai) part of the Agasthyamalai Biosphere Reserve, it flows down to the Gulf of Mannar Marine National Park in the Bay of Bengal after traveling for about 125 kilometers in Punnaikayal, a coastal town in Thoothukudi district. In the hills are a number of waterfalls, such as KalyanaTheertham Falls, Banatheertham Falls, Agasthiyar Falls, Manimuthar Falls etc.,.

== Climate ==
Like most parts of Tamil Nadu, the climate here is rather hot, except during the rainy season of the November/December months. During summer strong gusty winds are frequent. Precipitation and wind patterns are very similar to that of Kallidaikurichi.

Climate data for Ambasamudram, Tamil Nadu
Month	Jan	Feb	Mar	Apr	May	Jun	Jul	Aug	Sep	Oct	Nov	Dec	Year
Mean daily maximum °C (°F)	30.0 (86.0)	31.7 (89.1)	33.5 (92.3)	33.7 (92.7)	34.2 (93.6)	32.7 (90.9)	31.8 (89.2)	32.2 (90.0)	32.5 (90.5)	31.5 (88.7)	29.8 (85.6)	29.5 (85.1)	31.9 (89.5)
Mean daily minimum °C (°F)	22.1 (71.8)	22.7 (72.9)	24.2 (75.6)	25.4 (77.7)	26.2 (79.2)	25.5 (77.9)	25.2 (77.4)	25.1 (77.2)	24.8 (76.6)	24.3 (75.7)	23.3 (73.9)	22.4 (72.3)	24.3 (75.7)
Average precipitation mm (inches)	37 (1.5)	30 (1.2)	47 (1.9)	82 (3.2)	71 (2.8)	77 (3.0)	60 (2.4)	39 (1.5)	55 (2.2)	193 (7.6)	202 (8.0)	95 (3.7)	988 (39)
Source: Climate-Data.org

== Demographics ==
Religious census
Religion	Percent(%)
Hindu	89.56%
Muslim	6.0%
Christian	4.3%
Sikh	0.01%
Buddhist	0.03%
Other	0.09%
No religion	0.02%

According to 2011 census, Ambasamudram had a population of 35,645 with a sex-ratio of 1,048 females for every 1,000 males, much above the national average of 929. A total of 3,293 were under the age of six, constituting 1,658 males and 1,635 females. Scheduled Castes and Scheduled Tribes accounted for 15.98% and 0.24% of the population respectively. The average literacy of the town was 78.91%, compared to the national average of 72.99%. The town had a total of : 9845 households. There were a total of 16,163 workers, comprising 376 cultivators, 1,863 main agricultural labourers, 2,367 in house hold industries, 9,818 other workers, 1,739 marginal workers, 16 marginal cultivators, 198 marginal agricultural labourers, 353 marginal workers in household industries and 1,172 other marginal workers.

As per the religious census of 2011, Ambasamudram had 89.56% Hindus, 6.% Muslims, 4.3% Christians, 0.01% Sikhs, 0.03% Buddhists, 0.09% following other religions and 0.02% following no religion or did not indicate any religious preference.

== Places of interest ==
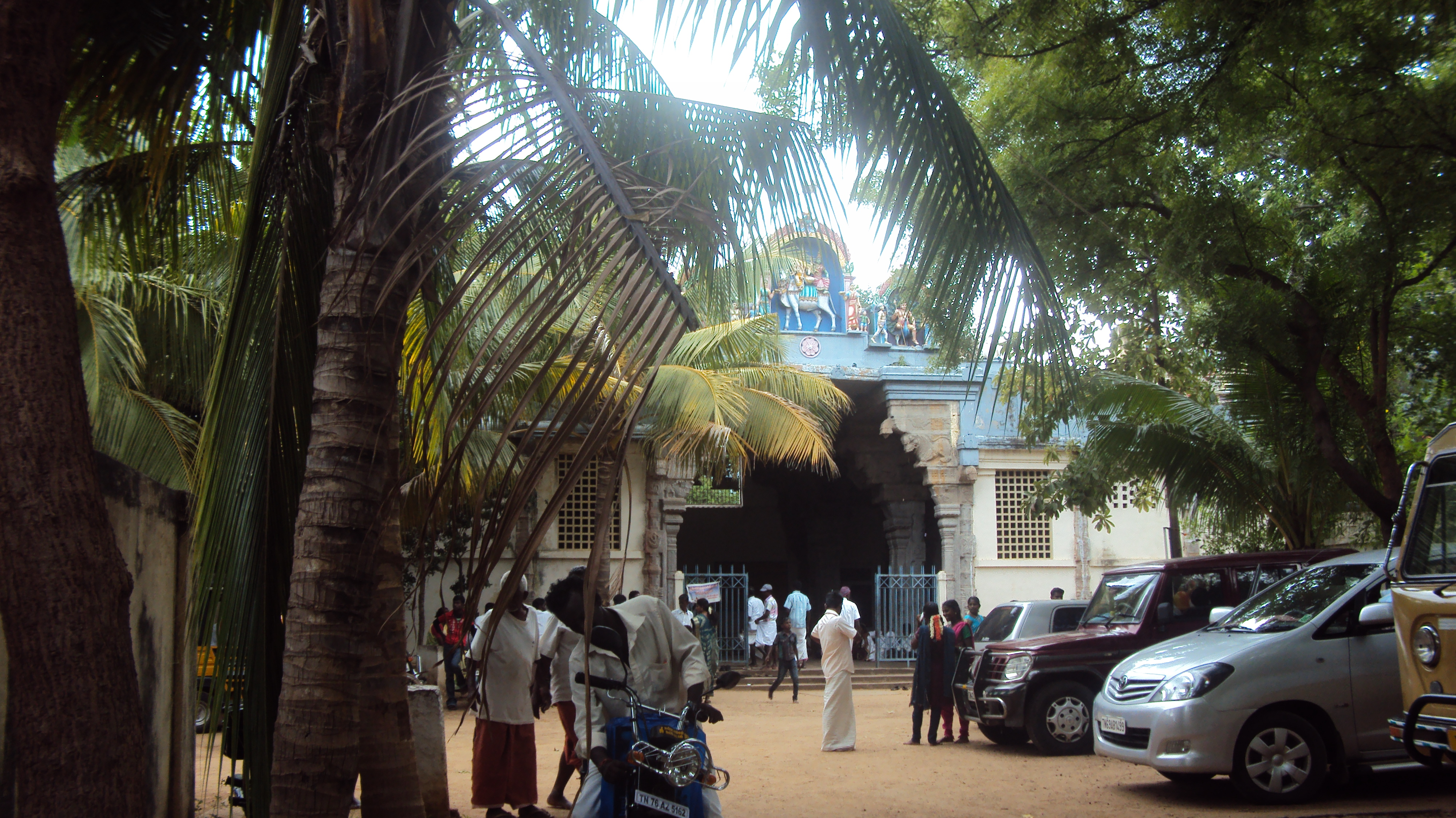
Sivasailam Temple, Sivasailam

Manjolai Hills is located between elevations ranging from 1,000 to 1,500 metres. The Manjolai area is deep within the Western Ghats, within the Kalakad Mundanthurai Tiger Reserve in the Tirunelveli District. Located on top of the Manimuthar Dam and the Manimuthar Water Falls, the Manjolai area comprises tea plantations, small settlements around the plantations; Upper Kodaiyar Dam and a windy view point called Kuthiravetti. Manimuttar Dam, Gadananathi River Dam, Rice Research Station of TNAU, Papanasam Dam, Karaiyar Dam, Singampatti Zamin palace, Servalar Dam, Kalakkad Mundanthurai Tiger Reserve, Agasthiyar Falls fed by lower dam., Baana Theertham Falls, Tamirabarani river, Sri Vedhanarayanar Rajagopalaswami Kulasekhara Azhwar Temple, Papanasaswamy Temple, Agashtiyar Temple, Krishnaswamy temple, kasi viswanathar temple and Durgai Amman Temple are the popular visitor attractions around the town. Also Papanasm, Agasthiyar falls which is around 5 km from Ambasamudram.

== Politics ==
Ambasamudram (State Assembly Constituency) is part of Tirunelveli (Lok Sabha constituency).

== See also ==
- Mannarkovil, an ancient temple town
- Brahmadesam, an ancient temple town
- Thiruppudaimarudur, an ancient temple town
- Veeravanallur, an ancient temple town
- Kallidaikurichi, Ambasamudram's twin town
- Papanasam
- Kutralam
