= Singampatti =

Singampatti Samasthanam
- Princely State
- Location in Tamil Nadu, India
- Coordinates: 8.7°N 77.47°E
- Country: India
- State: Tamil Nadu
- District: Tirunelveli district

Languages
  - Official: Tamil
- Time zone: UTC+5:30 (IST)

Singampatti . This palaiyam headed 24 of 72 palaiyams was located in present day Ambasamudram taluk, two miles from the spurs of the Western Ghats, in Tirunelveli district.

== History ==
According to tradition, the founder of the Singampatti family was Aabotharana Thevar belongs Siruthali kattiya Maravar or Thevar community, who on orders from the venad king of the day, routed an invading Arcot Nawab army and, as a reward, was given possession of Singampatti. This palaiyam headed 24 palaiyams of 72 palaiyams of south Tamil Nadu (Undivided Tirunelveli, Tenkasi, Thoothukudi and Kanyakumari).

== Coalition with Puli Thevar in Poligar War ==
Singampatti was one of the palaiyams that joined Puli Thevar’s coalition in 1754-1761 (see Nerkattumseval). In 1766, it joined the insurrectiont led by the polegar of Kollamkondan after victories over the Anglo-Nawabi forces helped the revolt spread to other polygars. That same year, General Donald Campbell began a systematic campaign, taking the forts of the major confederates one by one, including Singampati. Anxious over Hyder Ali’s activities, however, Campbell settled the polegars’ revenue accounts and restored them to their possessions in 1767.

== Post 1799 ==
At the end of the First Polygar War in 1799, the polygar of Singampati surrendered one fort and 105 armed men to Major J. Bannerman. The palaiyam, which had been under the company's administration since 1798, was restored to its former chief, Polygar 'Nallakutti Thevar, in 1801, at the conclusion of the Second Polegar War; it survived into the 19th century as a zamindari. The zamindari originally had an area of more than 90 sq. m., and included four villages.

== Post abolition of Zamindari ==
Singampatti currently comes under Ambasamudram Taluk of Tirunelveli District.

=== Places of interest ===
Manjolai Hills

Located between elevations ranging from 1000 to 1500 Metres, the Manjolai area is set deep within the Western Ghats within the Kalakad Mundanthurai Tiger Reserve in the Tirunelveli District. Located on top of the Manimuthar Dam & the Manimuthar Water Falls, the Manjolai area comprises Tea Plantations, Small settlements around the tea plantations; Upper Kodaiyar Dam and a windy view point called Kuthiravetti

The Tea Plantations and the whole of Manjolai Estates are tea operated by The Bombay Burmah Trading Corporation Ltd on Forest Lands leased by the Singampatti Zamindar in 1929. There are 3 Tea Estates within the Manjolai area - Manjolai Estate, Manimutharu Estate & Oothu Estate. The Estates are located on elevations ranging between 2300 Feet to 4200 Feet. The estates, road & the settlements in the Manjolai area are managed by Singampatti Groups and The Bombay Burmah Trading Corporation Ltd.
