= Ambasamudram taluk =

Coordinates: 8.703808°N 77.456081°E

The Ambasamudram taluk is in the Tirunelveli district of the Indian state of Tamil Nadu. The headquarters is the town of Ambasamudram.

== Demographics ==
According to the 2011 census, the taluk of Ambasamudram had a population of 427,557 with 209,974 males and 217,583 females. There were 1036 women for every 1000 men. The taluk had a literacy rate of 77.53. Child population in the age group below 6 was 20,705 males and 19,945 females.

== See also ==
- Rengasamudram
