= Mannarkovil =

- Village
- Location in Tamil Nadu
- Coordinates: 8.780006°N 77.408924°E
- Country: India
- State: Tamil Nadu
- District: Tirunelveli
- Elevation: 83 m (272 ft)

Population
  - Total: 5,000 (Approx)
- Postal code: 6274XX

Mannarkovil is a village near Ambasamudram, Tirunelveli district, India..
