= Veeravanallur =

- panchayat town
- Location in Tamil Nadu, India
- Coordinates: 8.6905432°N 77.5207785°E
- Country: India
- State: Tamil Nadu
- District: Tirunelveli

Population (2001)
  - Total: 19,681

Languages
  - Official: Tamil
- Time zone: UTC+5:30 (IST)
- PIN: 627426
- Telephone code: 04634
- Vehicle registration: TN 76

Veeravanallur (Veeravanallur) is a selection grade special panchayat town in the Cheranmahadevi taluk of Tirunelveli district in the Indian state of Tamil Nadu.

== Location ==
Veeravanallur Town Panchayat (also called Veerai) is located between Tiruppudaimarudur and Cheranmahadevi, on the banks of the Thamirabarani River. It is located 28 km from Tirunelveli; 40 km from Tenkasi; 40 km from Alangulam; and 30 km from Kalakkad.

== Demographics ==
As of 2001 India census, Veeravanallur had a population of 19,681. Males constitute 49% of the population and females 51%. Veeravanallur has an average literacy rate of 76%, higher than the national average of 59.5%: male literacy is 83%, and female literacy is 69%. In Veeravanallur, 9% of the population is under 6 years of age.

== Structure of Town Panchayat ==
The Veeravanallur town panchayat has a total area of 9.13 km^{2}, 18 wards, and 129 streets. It falls under the Ambasamudram Assembly Constituency and the Tirunelveli Lok Sabha Constituency.

== Schools ==
=== High Schools ===
- Bharathiyar Government Higher Secondary School (English, Tamil) (Formerly: Hindu Higher Secondary School)
- St. John's Higher Secondary School (English, Tamil)

=== Middle Schools ===
- R.C. Middle School
- Panchayat Union Middle School (English, Tamil)
- Thiru Gnana Sambandhar Middle School

=== Primary Schools ===
- Indira Nursery and Primary School (English)
- TDTA Primary School (Tamil)
- Sakayam Lourdes Antony Primary School

== Colleges ==
- St. John's College of Education
- St. John's College of Physical Education

== Transportation ==
Veeravanallur, has both Government and Private bus facilities almost to all parts of the district, especially to the cities of Tirunelveli, Ambasamudram, Papnasam, Tenkasi, and Nagercoil. There are also specific buses to Madurai, Rameshwaram, and Dindigul districts.

Veeravanallur railway station provides train services to Tirunelveli and the cities of Tenkasi and Sengottai.

== See also ==
- Seeniyapuram
