= Gadananathi River =

Coordinates: 8.728316°N 77.492205°E

Gadanaa nadhi River
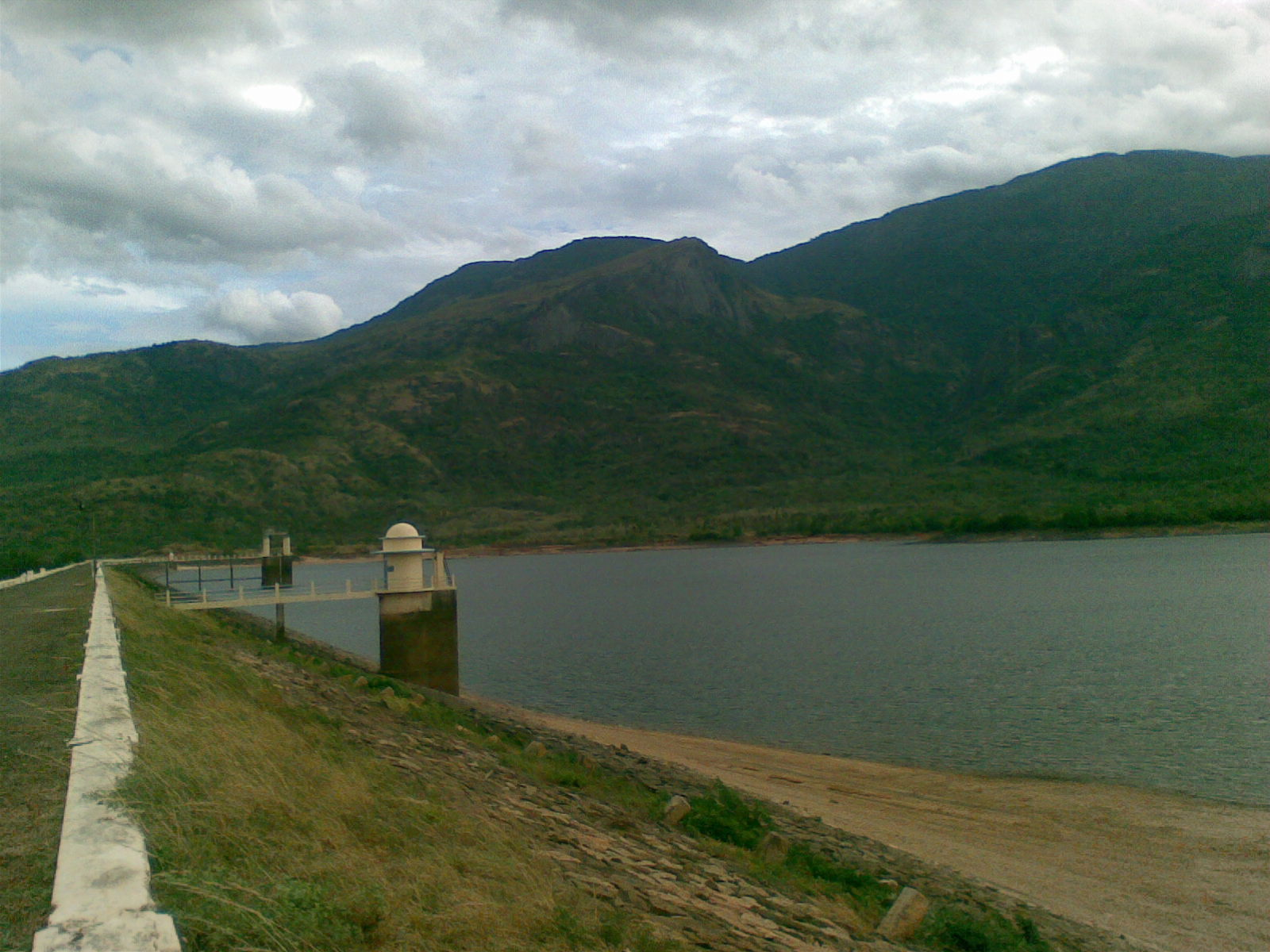
- Gadana nadi or Karunai river dam

Location
- Country: India
- State: Tamil Nadu
- District: Tirunelveli
- Cities: Tirunelveli, Ambasamudram

Physical characteristics
- Source: Agasthya malai Biosphere Reserve, Pothigai hills
- Mouth
  - location: Tiruppudaimaruthur
- Length: 43 km (27 mi)
- Discharge
  - location: Tiruppudaimaruthur

Basin features
- Tributaries
  - left: Kallar, Karunaiyar, Veeranathi, Jambunathi
  - right: Raamanadhi Rivers

Gadananathi (கடனாநதி), also called as Gadananadhi or Gatananadhi or Kadananathi or Kadananadhi is a river flowing in the Tirunelveli district of the Indian state of Tamil Nadu.

Gadananathi originates from Agasthyamalai Biosphere Reserve. The towns Ambasamudram and Kallidaikurichi are located respectively on the left and right banks of Thamiraparani, after which the river meets the tributary Gadananathi River at Tiruppudaimaruthur. Before the Gadananathi's entry into the Thamirabarani, the Gadananathi is joined by the rivers Kallar, Karunaiyar and Veeranathi or Varahanathi which joins the river Gadananathi about 1.5 kilometres (0.9 mi) north-east of Kizha Ambur.

The Gadananathi is fed by the Jambunathi and Ramanathi Rivers. The Gadananadhi has 6 anicuts and a reservoir of 9,970,000 cubic metres (8,080 acre·ft), and irrigates 38.87 square kilometres (15.01 sq mi) of wetlands. The anaicuts are Arasapattu anaicut, Alwarkurichi Thenkal anaicut, Manjapalli anaicut, Kakkavallur anaicut and Kangeyan anaicut. Gadananathi joins Tamariraparani at Tiruppudaimaruthur. The length of the river is 43 kilometres (27 mi).This river flows on many villages like Sambankulam, Sivasailam, Karuthapillaiyur, Poovankurichi, Kizha Ambur.

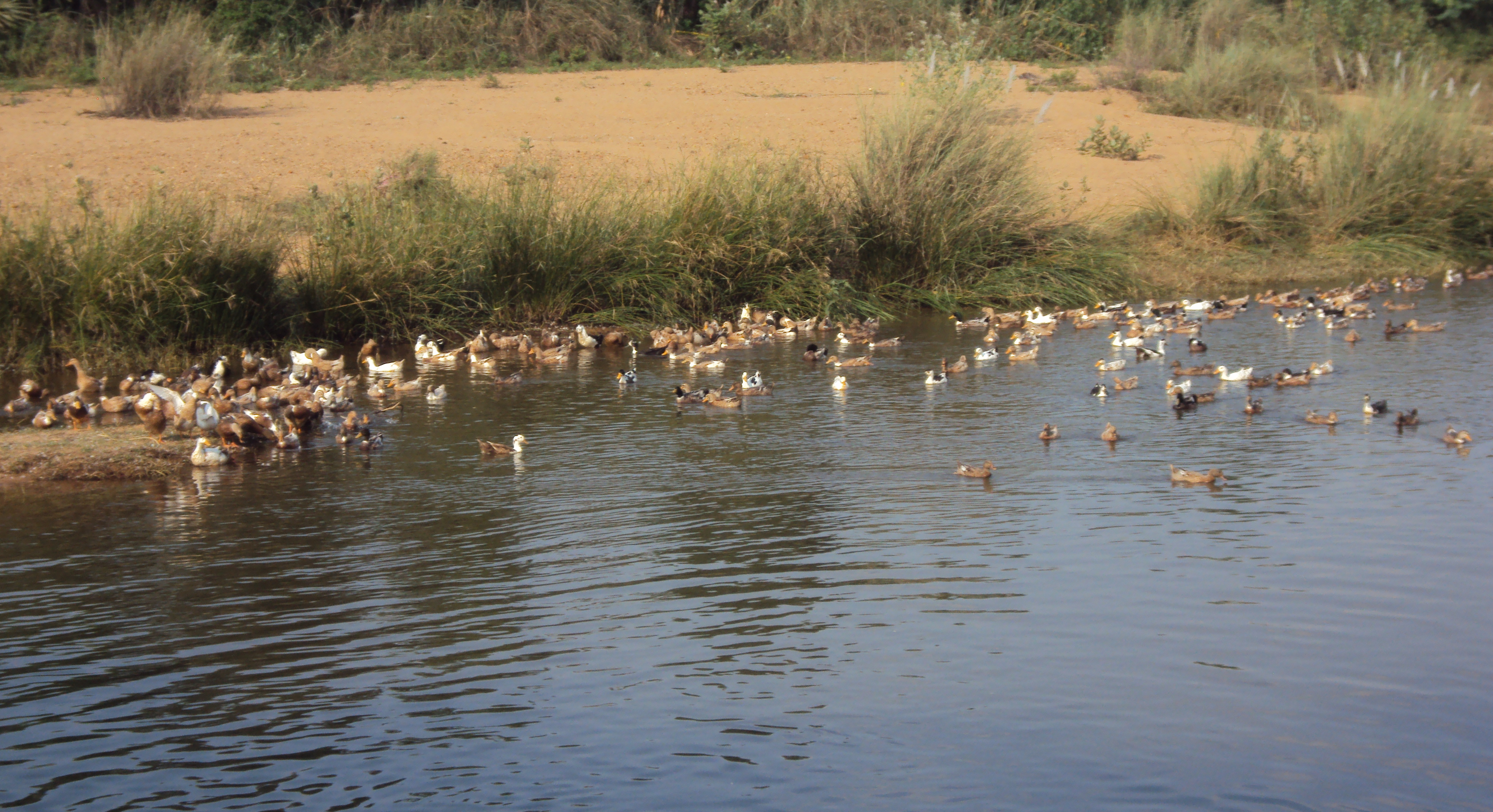
Ducks swimming in Kadana river in Poovankurichi

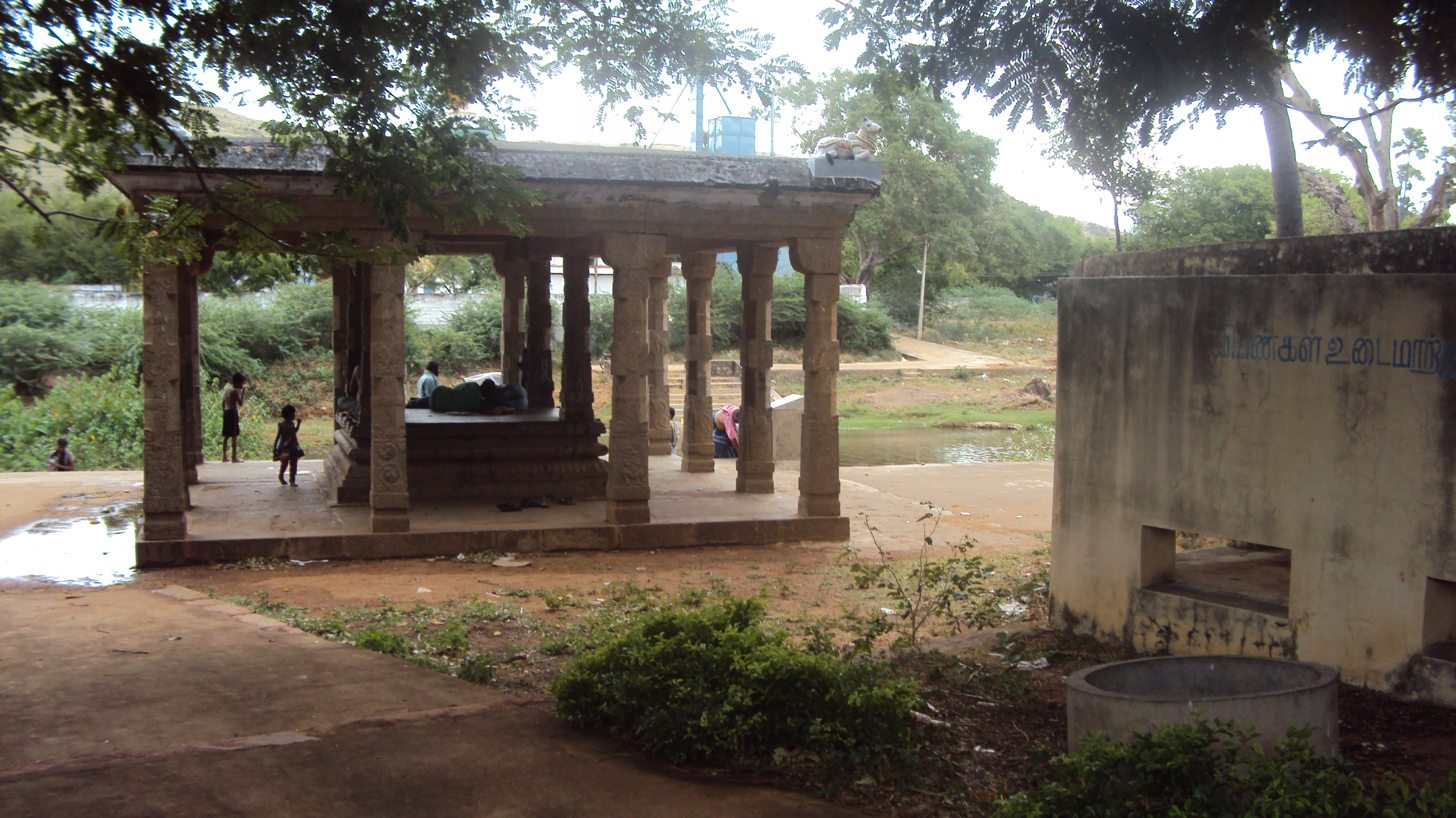
Mani mandapam on the bank of River Gadananathi

== Gadananathi Dam ==
Gadana Nathi Reservoir, also spelt as Kadana Nathi Dam is located at the foot of the western Ghats in Sivasailm village near Alwarkurichi which is one of the important tourist places of Tirunelveli district. Nowadays many tourists visit the dam and park. During the Courtallam season and Sabarimalai season more number of tourists visit this place. It is in Tenkasi famous Spa.

== See also ==
List of rivers of Tamil Nadu
