= Kizha Ambur =

Kizha Ambur Snehapuri
- Village
- Location in Tamil Nadu, India Kizha Ambur (India)
- Coordinates: 8.7413°N 77.39°E
- Country: India
- State: Tamil Nadu
- District: Tenkasi
- Elevation: 88 m (289 ft)

Languages
  - Official: Tamil
- Time zone: UTC+5:30 (IST)
- PIN: 627418
- Telephone code: (91)4634
- Vehicle registration: TN-76, TN-72
- Website: municipality.tn.gov.in/Tirunelveli

Kizha Ambur also known as Keela Ambur is an ancient village situated close to the Western Ghats in Tenkasi, Tamil Nadu, India. The ancient name of this village is Snehapuri. Later it was called as Anpur (Sneham=Anpu) and currently called as KizhaAmbur.

The village has a Railway Station and Bus Stand. Bus is the primary mode of transport due to the proximity of the bus stand closer to public compared to the Railway Station.

The village is surrounded by other small villages like kakka Nallur, Poovan Kurichi, and Thattan Patti. Kizha Ambur is in good location surrounded by several tourist attraction. These attractions include: Siva Sailam Temple, Papanasam, Higher and Lower dams of Papanasam, Vaana Theertham, Mani Mutharu, Manjolai, Courtallam, Athri Theertham, and Sadai Udaiyar temple near Kallidai Kurichi.

== History ==
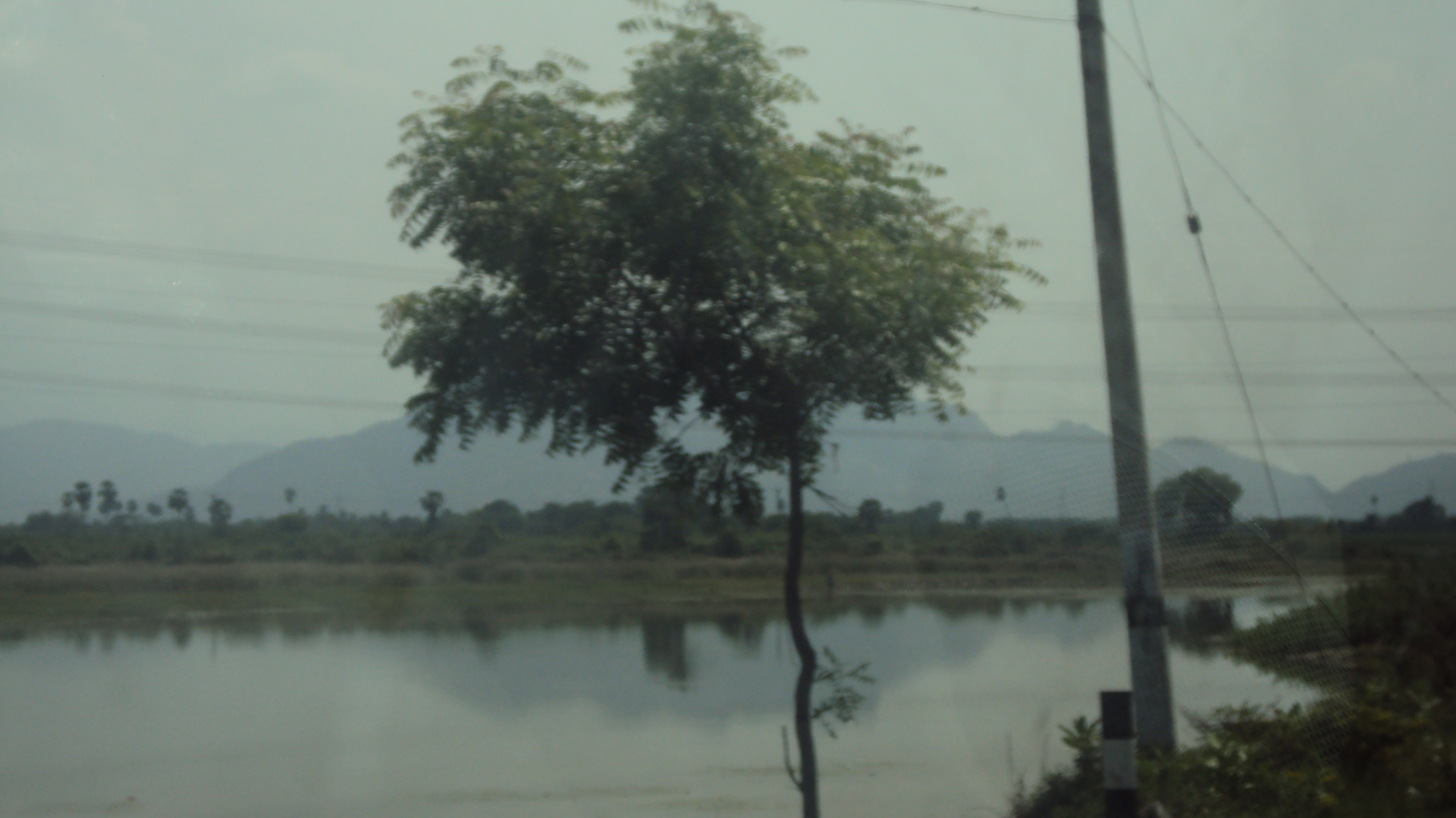
Podhigai mountain's shadow falling on Poovankurichi lake

Kizha Ambur is an ancient village with rich culture has an old name Snekapuri (Tamil: சிநேகபுரி). Sneka in Sanskrit means "Love" (Tamil: அன்பு). Puri can be translated as a village (Tamil: ஊர்). So if we translate it in Tamil the name will be "Anbu-oor" which has metamorphized as "Ambur" (Tamil: ஆம்பூர்).Another reason is found in the stone inscription of Sivasailam temple is that Aambal flower is found in Poovan Kurichi lake. So it got the name Ambur. There are many temples in this village. They are ancient and very powerful. Some of the important ones are-: 1. Perumal temple 2. Aathangarai Shivan temple 3. Vadakavachalli aman temple

The Kumbaabhishegam of the Aathangarai Shivan temple (River Shiva temple) was held on 19 May 2016. This is a powerful temple and has the ability to fulfill the devotees prayers. There is also a procession of Paramakalyani Samedha Sivasailapathi to this village which comes from Alwazhkurichi. The procession is organized by the village people. The temples in this village are very beneficent.

== Resources ==
The village is the birthplace of Goddess Sri.Paramakalyani, the consort of the presiding Deity Sri. Sivalsailanathar, at Sivasailam. Kizha ambur is nature surrounded village with a beautiful river named Gadananathi River.

== Gallery ==
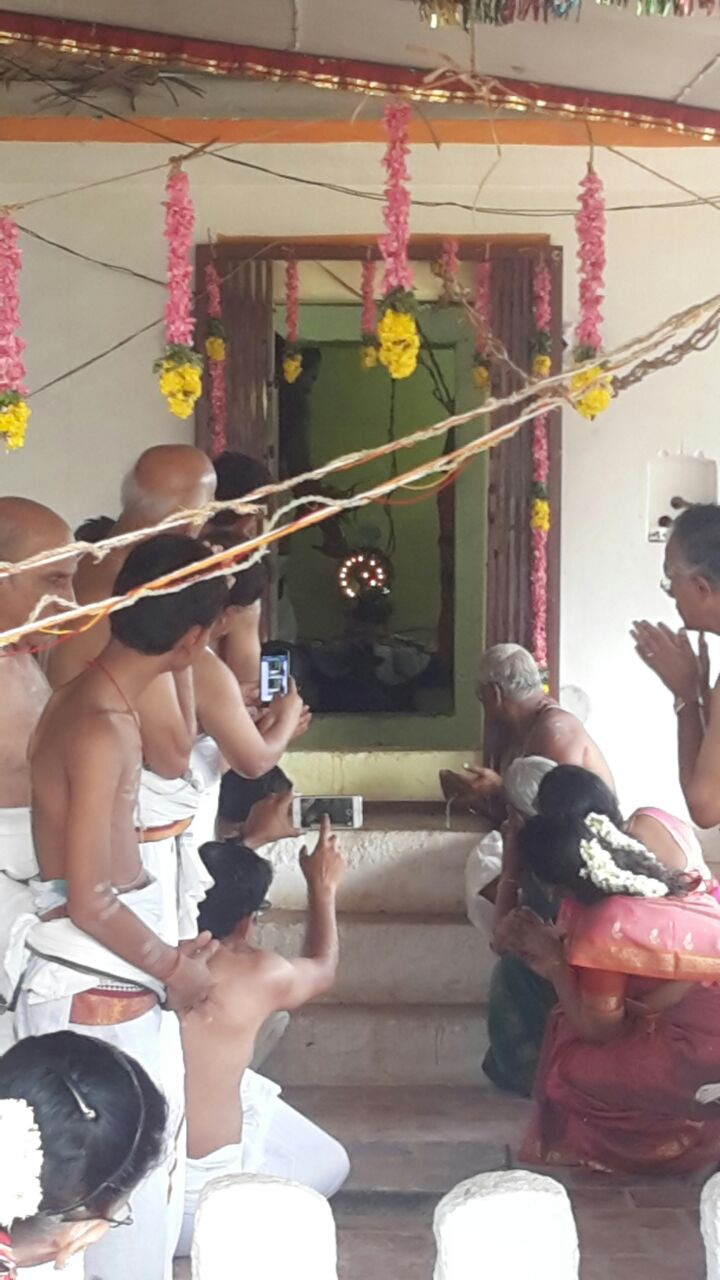

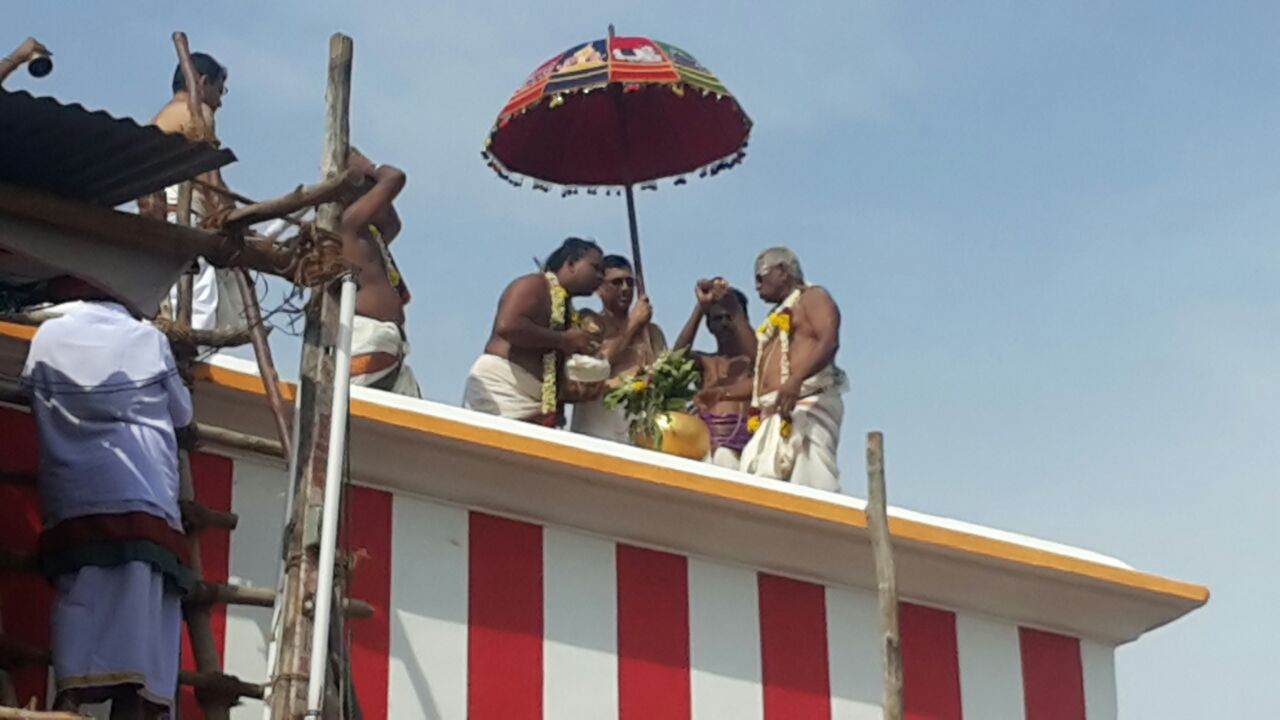

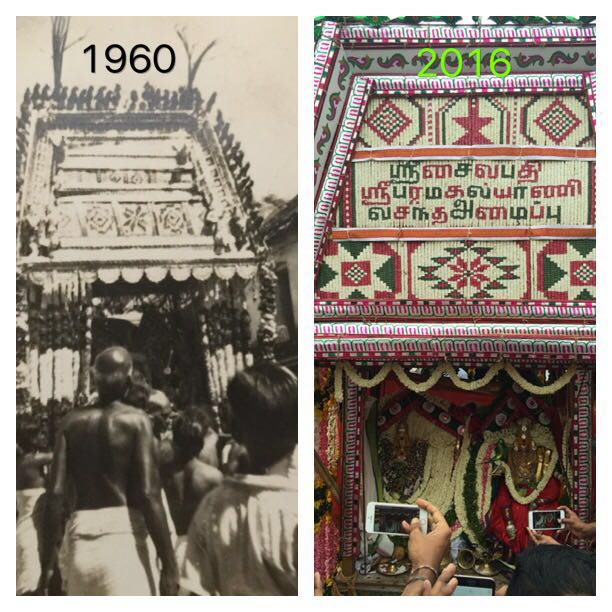

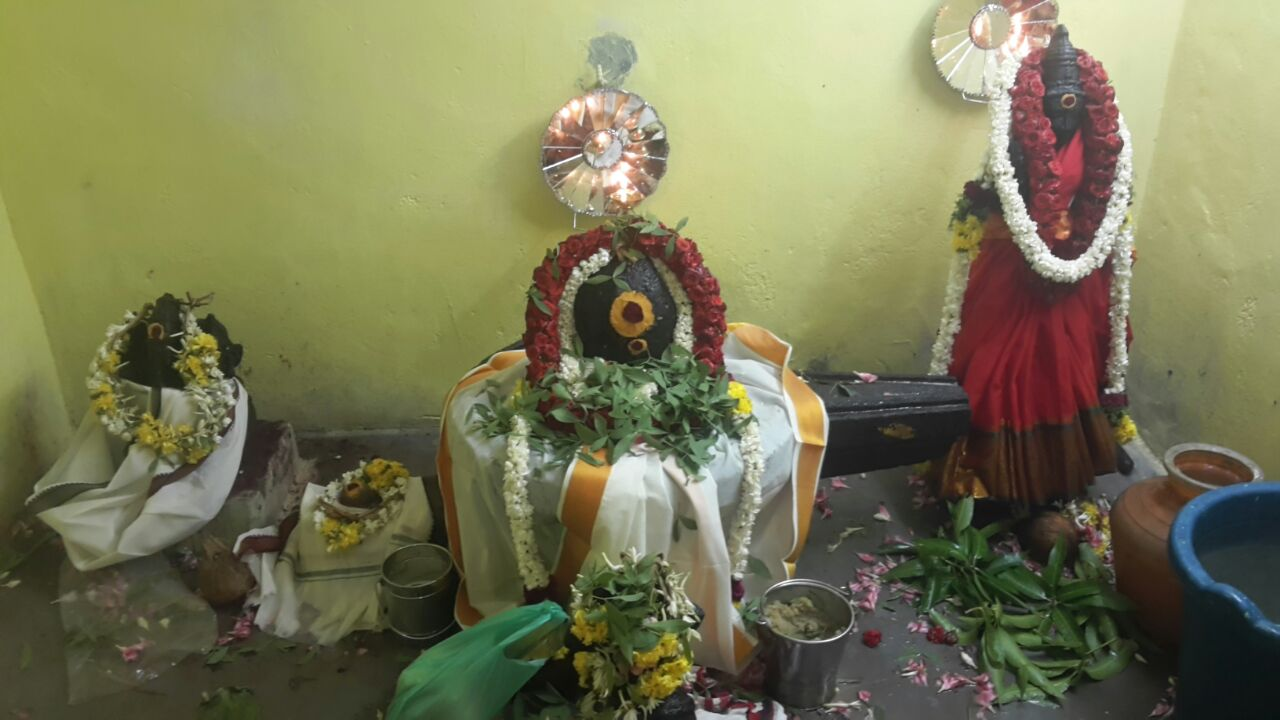

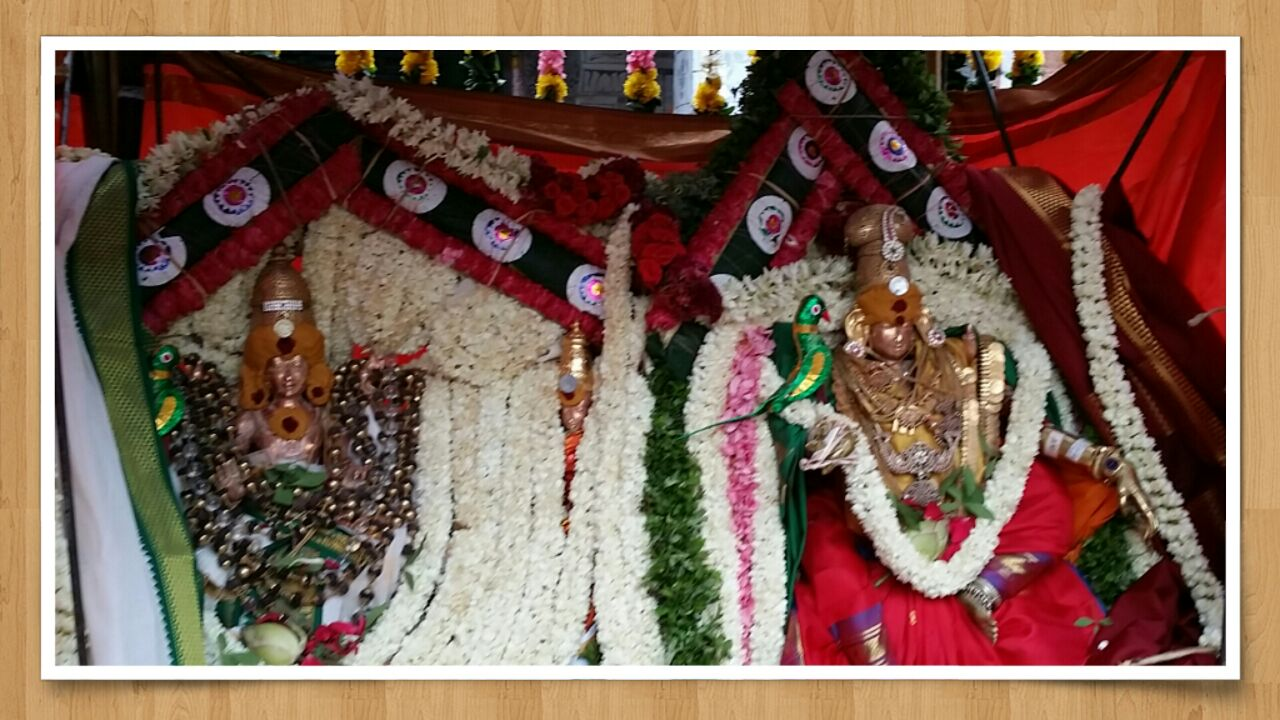

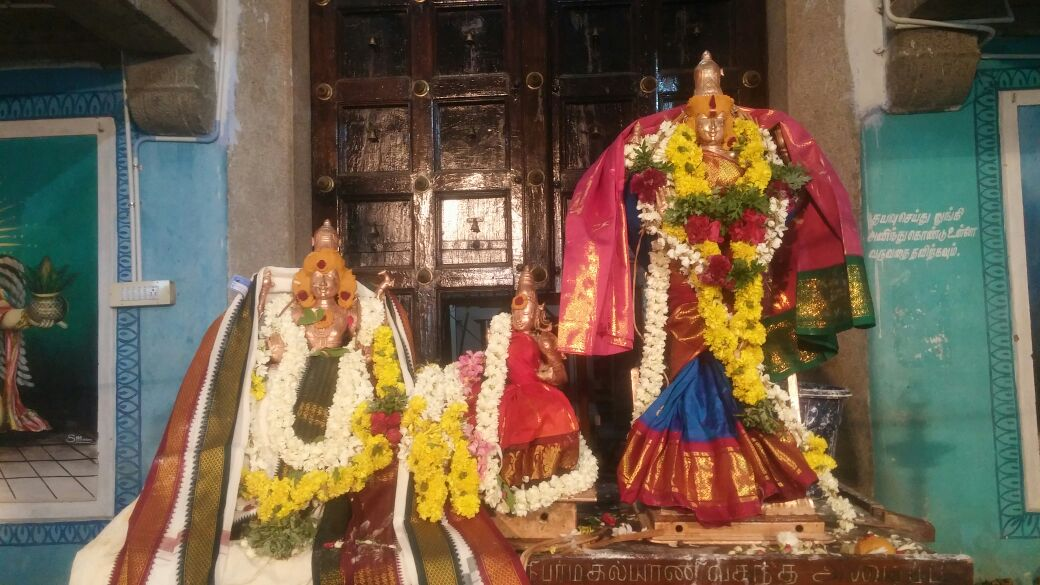

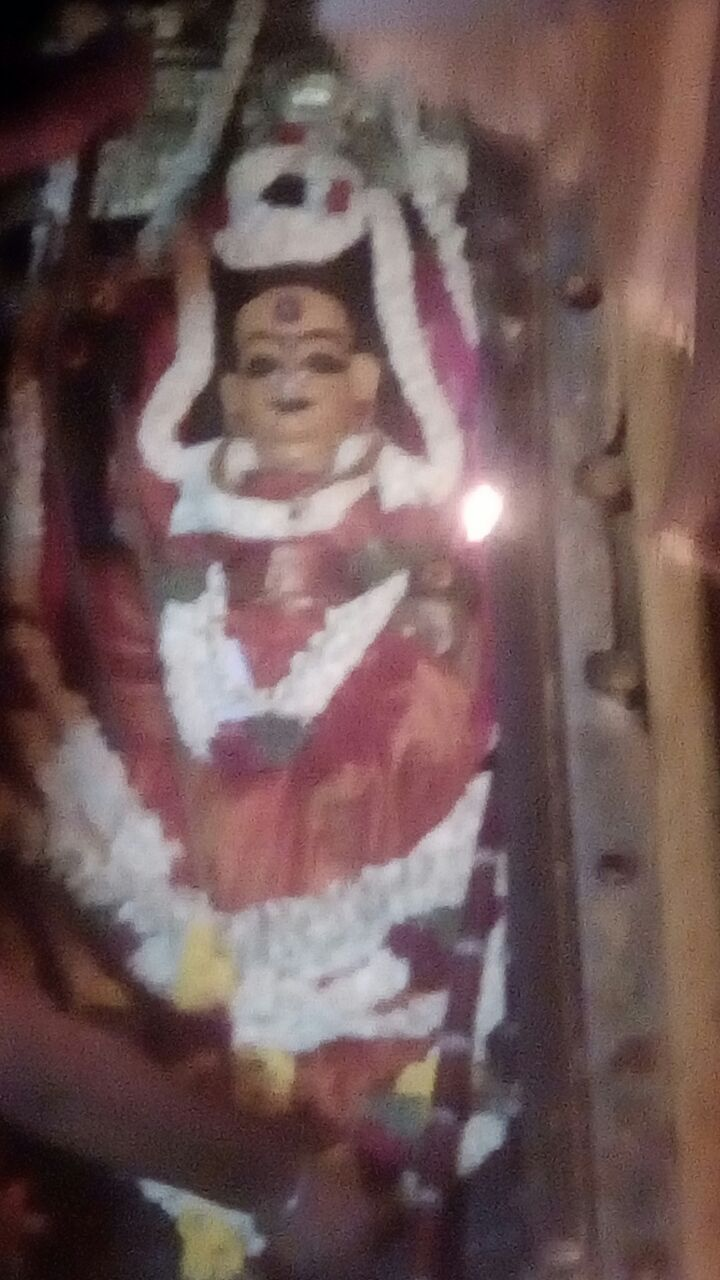
