= Poovankurichi =

- village
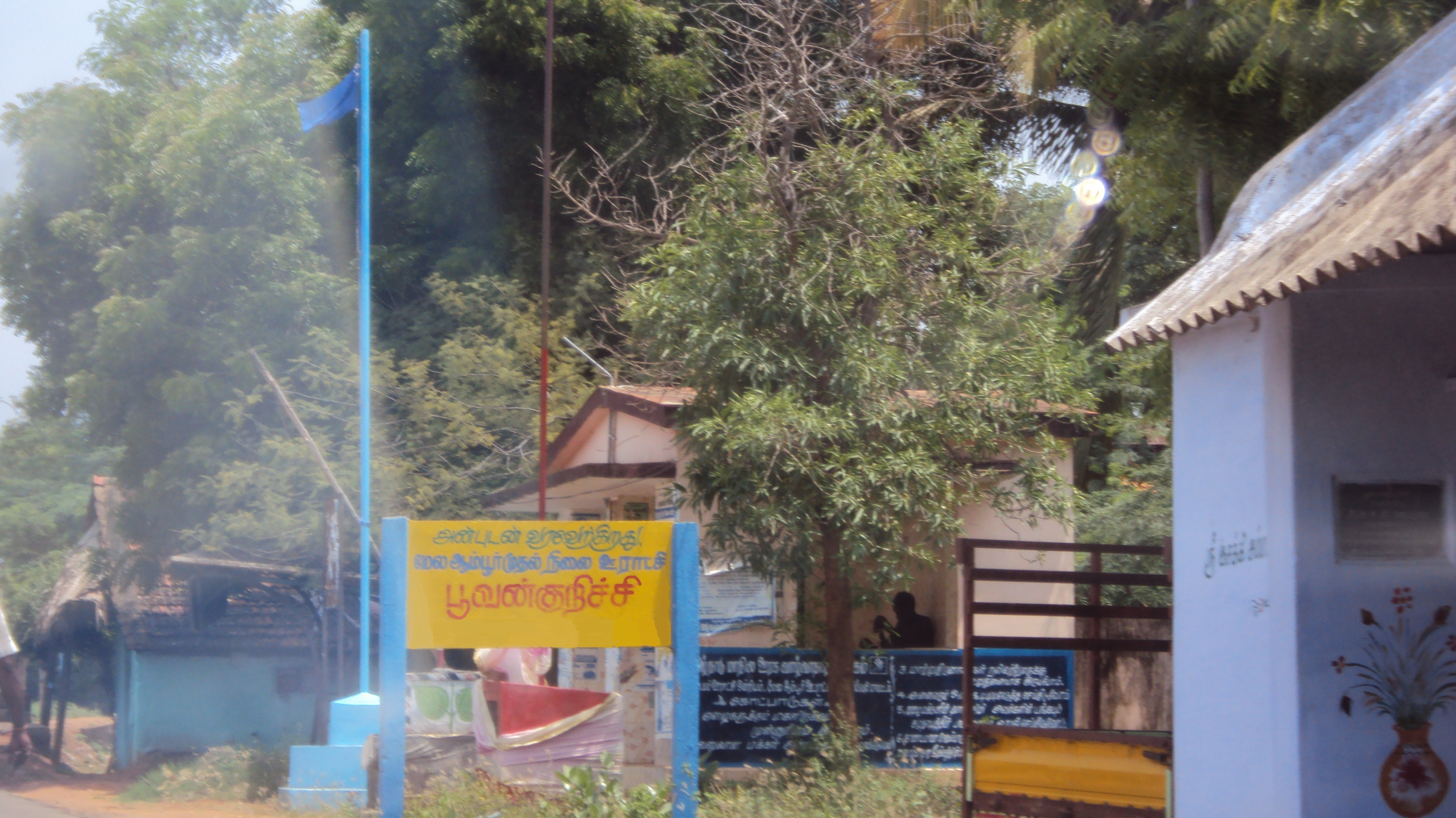
- Poovankurichi name board

- Location in Tamil Nadu, India Poovankurichi (India)
- Coordinates: 8.7598°N 77.3820°E
- Country: India
- State: Tamil Nadu
- District: Tirunelveli
- Elevation: 90 m (300 ft)

Languages
  - Official: Tamil
- Time zone: UTC+5:30 (IST)
- PIN: 627418
- Telephone code: (91)4634
- Vehicle registration: TN-76, TN-72
- Website: municipality.tn.gov.in/Tirunelveli

Poovankurichi or Poovan Kurichi is a village situated in the district of Tirunelveli near Ambasamudram, Tamil Nadu, India. Poovan means "wind" and kurichi means "mountain or a place located near a mountain".

== Geography ==
Poovankurichi is located on the bank of Gadananathi River (Kadana Nadi), which means "kadana dam river" and flows throughout the year. The area is surrounded by three lakes and a canal but it is mainly surrounded by mountains and hills which are part of the Western Ghats. The village has many paddy fields, mango orchards, vegetable gardens, palm trees and tall coconut trees.

There are thousands of herbs found in Poovankurichi. 108 herbs are available in the Papanasam hill area which are not found in other parts of the world.

The village is located 50 km west of Tirunelveli town. Surrounding villages and hamlets include Kakayan Nallur, Kovankulam, Ambur, and Thattan Patti.

== Transportation ==
Bus and train are the major transport methods. The nearest railway station is in Kizha Ambur Railway Station, 1.7 km from the village.

== Climate ==
The place will be greenish even during the summer months. During the month of Chitirai (mid April) to Puratasi (mid October) wind from the mountains blows gently and rain sprinkles and makes the place cool.

== Industry ==
Agriculture is the main industry in the hamlet, which was once also involved in weaving.

== History ==
Poovan Kurichi has more than 2000 years of history and has retained the same name from its inception. Ancient burial urns called Mudhumakkal Thazhi was found in Poovankurichi in the year 1950.

== Nature ==
Bird species that can be seen in the area include parrots, peacocks, crows, herons, woodpeckers, kingfishers, ducks, Myna/Asian Koel, vultures, Cattle Egrets, Black Winged Stilts, Red Vented Bulbuls, owls and ThenChittu.

Animals in the area include bears, rabbits, wild boars, the Lion-tailed macaque, monkeys, leopards, pythons, the King Cobra, chameleons, porcupines, the Monitor Lizard and deer.

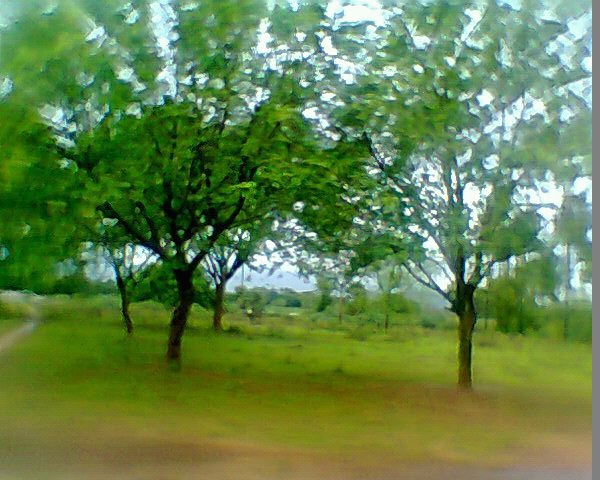

== Gallery ==
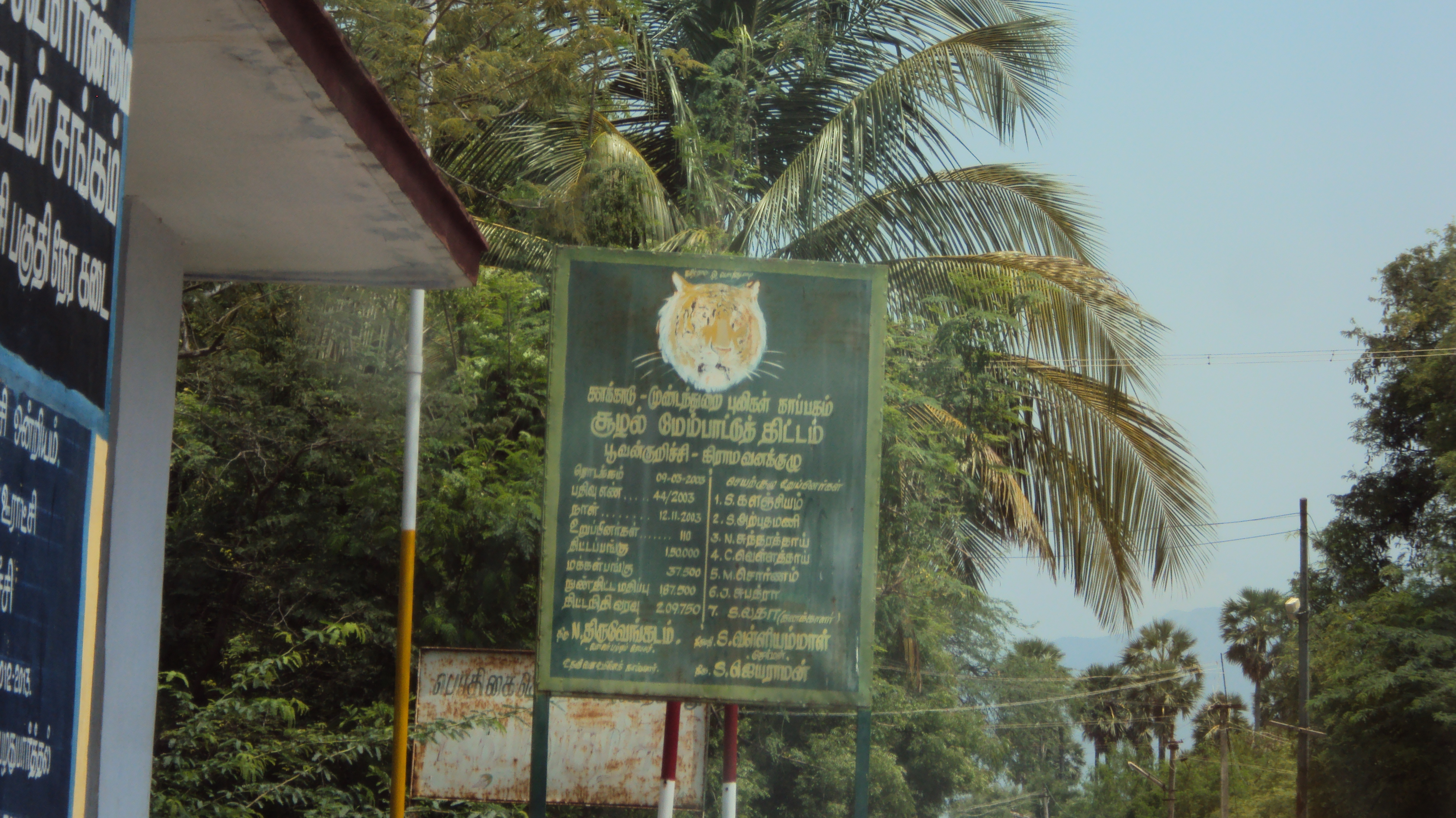
Poovankurichi sign board

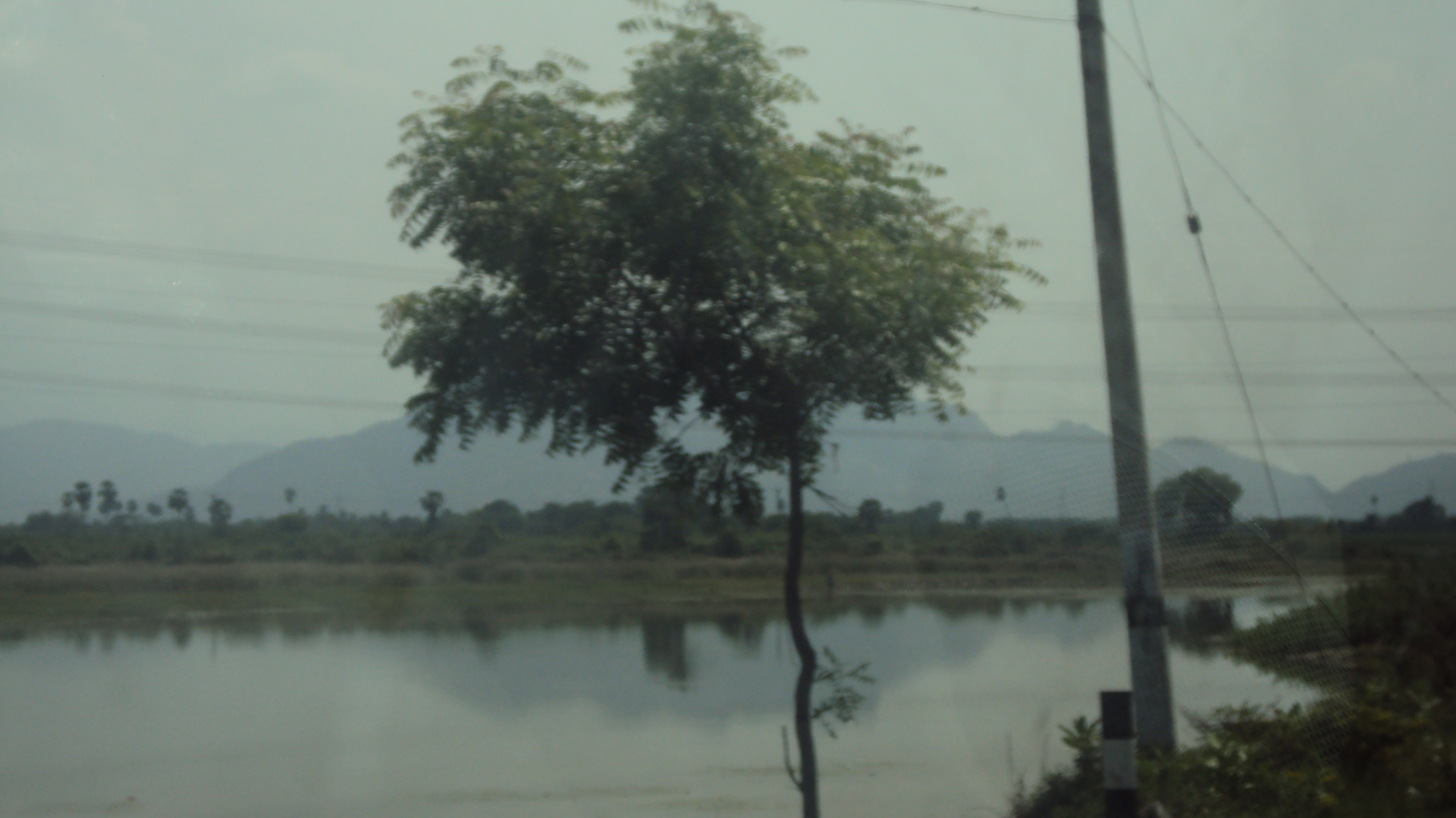
Podhigai mountain's shadow falling on Poovankurichi lake

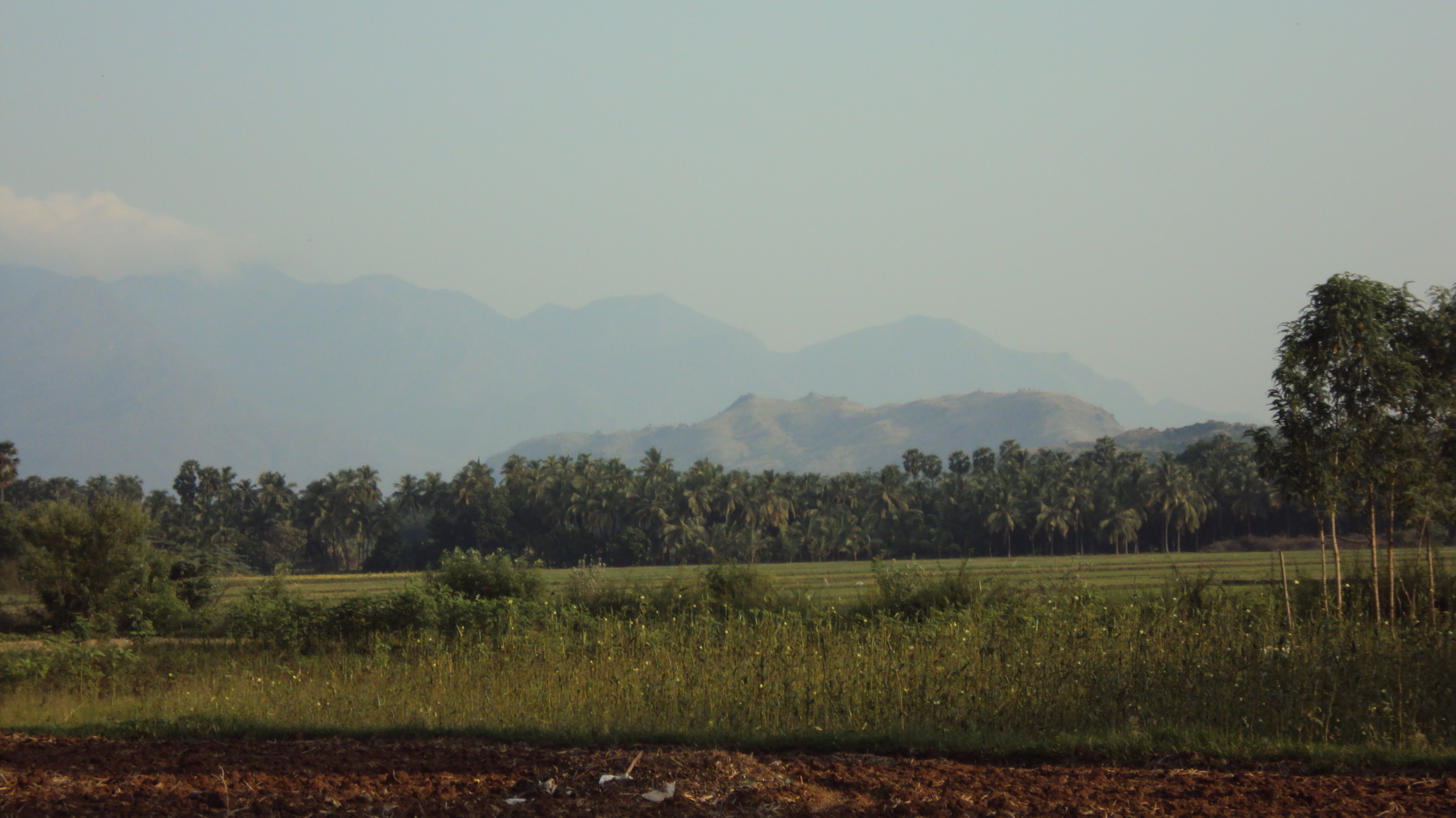
View of Podhigai from Poovankurichi

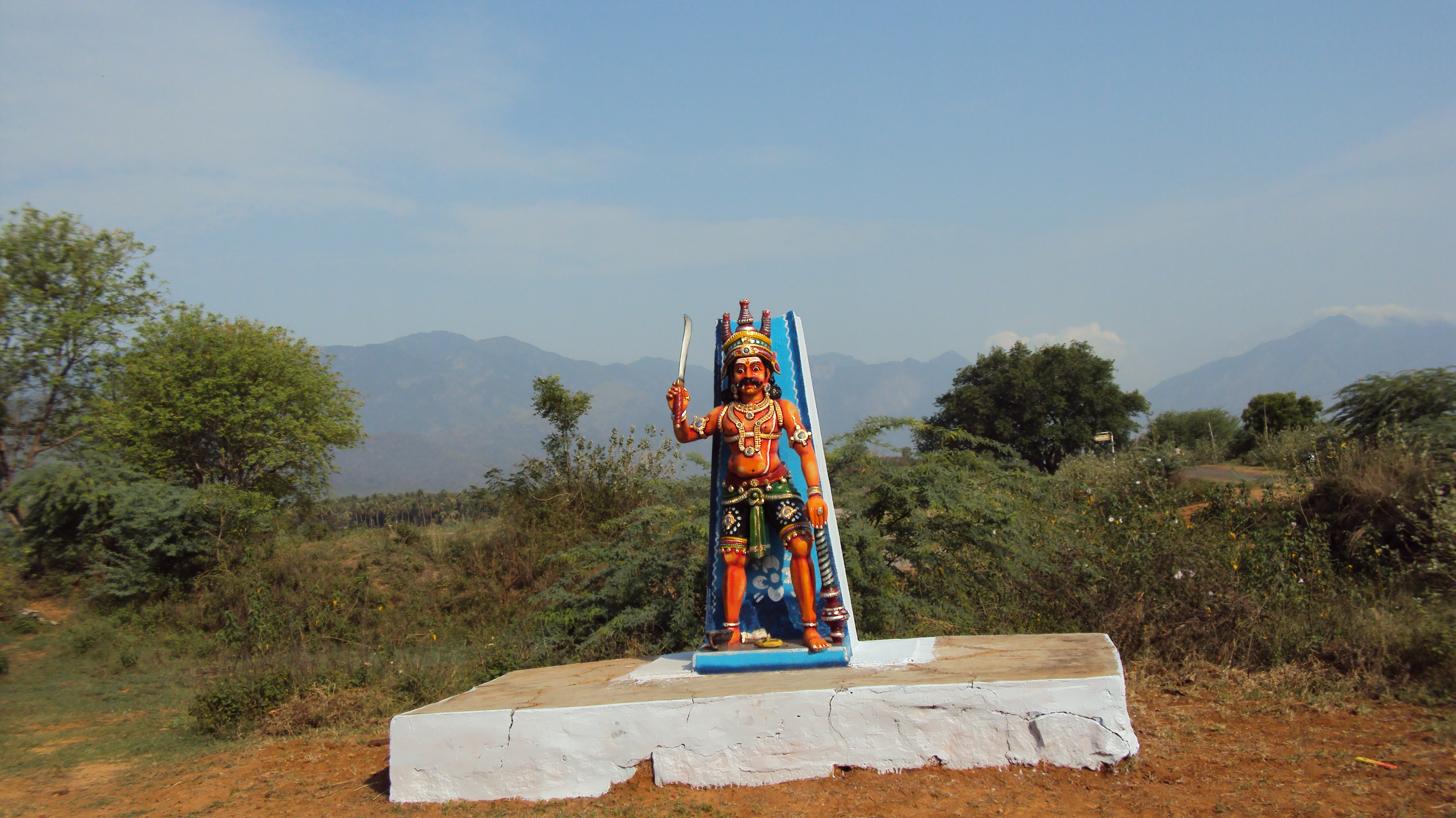
Painted Statue in Poovankurichi near Mela Kulam

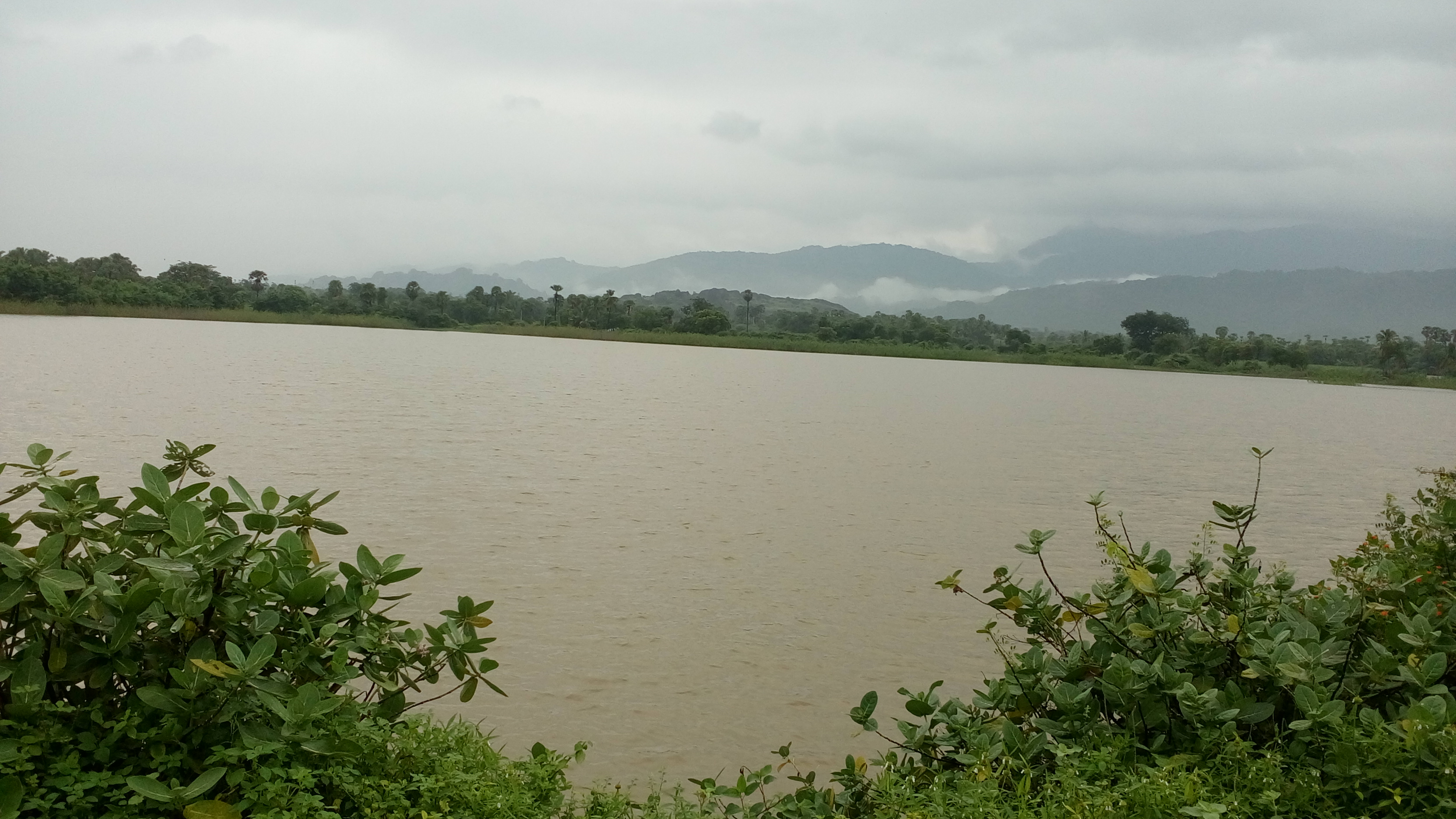
Poovankurichi Kilakulam

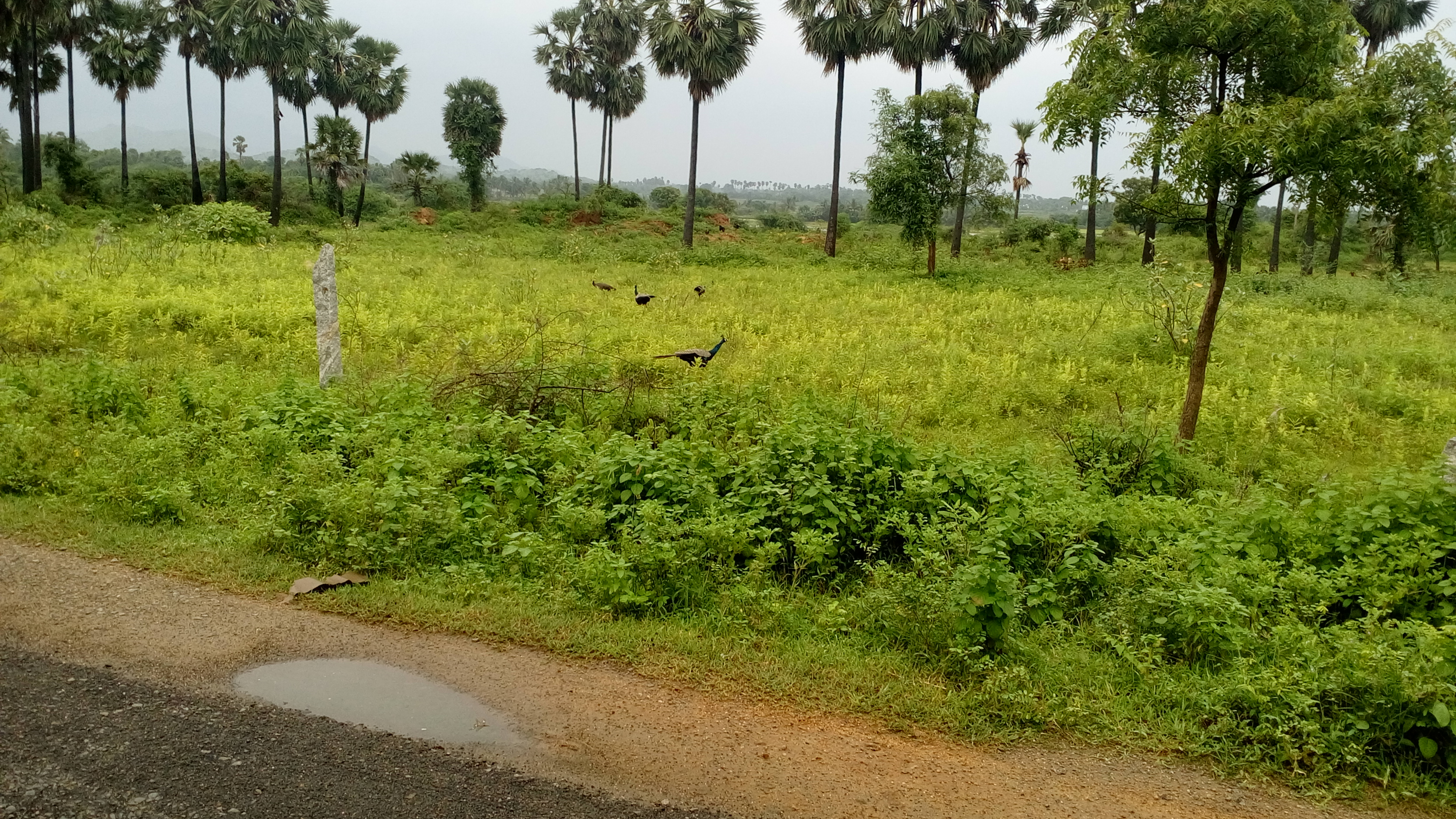
Peacocks in PoovankurichI
