= Alwarkurichi =

- Town
- Location in Tamil Nadu, India
- Coordinates: 8°46′45″N 77°24′11″E
- Country: India
- State: Tamil Nadu
- District: Tenkasi

Population (2011)
  - Total: 10,045

Languages
  - Official: Tamil
- Time zone: UTC+5:30 (IST)

Alwarkurichi is a panchayat town in Tenkasi district in the state of Tamil Nadu, India.

== Location ==
Alwarkurichi is a small town 35 km or 45 Min travel from west of Tirunelveli town and 25 km from Tenkasi town. Located near western ghats (Ambasamudram - Tenkasi highway) surrounded by paddy fields, western ghats locate west of the town. The village has Gadananathi River on its east and rama river on its west

== Demographics ==
As of 2001 India census, Alwarkurichi had a population of 9447. Males constitute 50% of the population and females 50%. Alwarkurichi has an average literacy rate of 71%, higher than the national average of 59.5%; with 56% of the males and 44% of females literate. 11% of the population is under 6 years of age.
