= Thalaivankottai =

- village
- Location in Tamil Nadu, India
- Coordinates: 9.16°N 77.55°E
- Country: India
- State: Tamil Nadu
- District: Tenkasi district

Languages
  - Official: Tamil
- Time zone: UTC+5:30 (IST)
- Postal code: 627773
- Vehicle registration: TN-79

Thalaivankottai is traditionally recognized as one of the 72 Palaiyams of Madurai. This Maravar Palaiyam was located in the Sivagiri Taluk, at the foot of the Western Ghats, in the Tirunelveli province of the Nayak Kingdom of Madurai.

== Palayakkarar (Polygar) ==
Thalaivankottai's Polygar belonged to the Kondayam-Kottai subcaste of the Maravar. The Polygar family traced its origins to a court official of the latter Pandya Kings. Thailavankottai was one of the Palaiyams that joined Puli Thevar’s coalition in 1754–1762 (Nerkattumseval).

== Post-1799 ==
At the end of the First Polygar War in 1799, the Polygar of Thalaivankottai surrendered two forts and 100 armed men to Major J. Bannerman. At the time of the general settlement of 1802, Zamindar Sivanu Thevar held five villages. The Palaiyam survived into the 19th century as a Zamindari consisting of eighteen villages and having an area of 6.14 square metres and a population (in 1879) of 3,117. The Polygars carry the same title Indhran with their names. The last titled Zamindar, Indhran Ramasamy Pandya Thalaivanar, (who belongs to the Kondayamkottai Subcaste of Maravars) married Sivabaghyanachiar, Sethupathy Princess of Ramnad, (belonging to the royal Marika branch of Semmanadu Maravars) in 1944 and had five children — three sons and two daughters. The royal family of Thalaivankottai and their heirs administered all the temples in Thalaivankottai and its surroundings, most notably the Masthiasthanathar temple of Dharugapuram.
