= Uthumalai =

Uthumalai Uthumalai
- Village
- Location in Tamil Nadu, India Uthumalai (India)
- Coordinates: 8°59′09″N 77°32′00″E
- Country: India
- State: Tamil Nadu
- District: Tenkasi
- Taluk: Veerakeralampudur

Population (2011)
  - Total: 7,737

Languages
  - Official: Tamil
- Time zone: UTC+5:30 (IST)

Uthumalai, also known as Uttumalai, is a village in the Indian state of Tamil Nadu. It lies in Veerakeralampudur taluk, which itself is in Tenkasi district.

== History ==
The village was once governed by what anthropologist Nicholas Dirks terms "little kings", (Note: Dirks considers "little kings" to be of "intermediate size and significance".) who were polygars from the Maravar caste. Theirs was the largest in area, although not in population, of several Maravar-governed lands in what is now Tirunelveli district.

The lands formed a part of the 1803 Permanent Settlement in Madras Presidency and became recognised by the British East India Company (EIC) as a zamindari estate, with its palace at Veerakeralampudur. In 1823, it comprised 123 square miles (320 km^{2}), with a population of 14,612; administratively situated in Tenkasi taluk by 1917, it was the third-largest of all the zamindaris in the district, comprising 63 villages spread over an area of 123 square miles (320 km^{2}), with an estimated population of 51,246.

The zamindari estates of the area arose in the aftermath of the Polygar Wars, when the British conferred the status on those who they deemed not to have been subversive. Uthumalai had sided with them in opposition to Polygar rebels such as Veerapandiya Kattabomman. The little kings were now expected to be landlords who managed local agriculture and paid an annual tribute, although even the British authorities had doubts about their transplanting of the settled property concept from its origins in Bengal Presidency to that of Madras.

Despite its zamindari status, in the first half of the century the British East India Company often imposed direct rule, overarching the position of the zamindar. The family gained a period of relatively independent governance during the regency of Peryanayaki Nachiar, who acted on behalf of her underage son, Irudalaya Marudappa Taver, after the death of his father in 1850. As an adult ruler, Irudalaya married Annapurni Nachiar and Menakshi Sundra Nachiar, although only the latter initially joined him in his palace – Annapurni was around six years old at the time of her marriage and so at first lived with her relatives. Those relatives assisted Irudalaya in opposing the claims of his uncle, who lived and held a title at Chokkampatti. (Note: Irudalay's uncle is sometimes described as a zamindar at Chokkampatti but was probably in fact a mittah because the Chokkampatti zamindari had been broken up.) Irudalaya was succeeded as zamindar upon his death in 1891 by an adopted son, Navanithakrishna Marudappa Taver, but the Court of Wards stepped in to govern on his behalf because he, too, was a minor. When Navanithakrishna died, a few months after his father, a family squabble broke out as Annapurni and Menakshi laid claim to the estate, each arguing that they had the closer relationship to Irudalaya and Navanithakrishna.

A wide range of arguments were put forward during the legal proceedings, such as a claim that Irudalayar had been too ill in his last years to formally adopt Navanithakrishna, that he had divorced Annapurni and she had forced her way into the palace, and that Menakshi could not have taken part in any adoption process – and thus could not be the adoptive mother – because her menstrual cycle made her ritually polluted. The court concentrated on the divorce and ritual arguments and ruled in favour of Menakshi, a decision that was upheld by the Privy Council on appeal.

== Demographics ==
The 2011 Census of India recorded Uthumalai as having 2,168 households and a population of 7,737, comprising 3,788 males and 3,949 females. A portion of the population was categorised as members of Scheduled Castes; there were no members of Scheduled Tribes.

== Infrastructure ==
Since 2012, the village has had a 700-kW wind turbine that feeds into the grid. As of 2011, the nearest town was Surandai, over 10 kilometres (6.2 mi) distant. The village had several educational facilities at all levels from pre-school to senior secondary; facilities for higher education were some distance away, with the exception of a non-vocational training centre. There were some primary healthcare facilities in the village, but the nearest hospital was over 10 km away. It had a veterinary hospital.

There was a sub-post office in the village, with a more major office less than 10 km away. Internet facilities were available, as was a bus service. The nearest railway station was over 10 km from the village and so too was the nearest market and ATM, although there were other banking facilities. Sankarankovil is a nearby municipality and nearest railway station, 24KM apart from village. The village contains 3 ATMs (1 nationalised bank ATM and 2 white label ATMs) and 2 banks (Central Bank of India and Pandian Grama Bank)

== Economy ==
The area of the village in 2011 was 3,443 hectares (8,510 acres), agriculture was the mainstay of the local economy and beedi was the main crop.
