= Agarakattu =

Agarakattu (also known as Akarakattu or Agarai or Akarai) is a village in Tirunelveli district, Tamil Nadu, India. It is on the banks of the Hanuman River very near Tenkasi city, where the majority of the population is Catholic Christians.

Until 1956, this village Agarakattu and the area from Sengottai to Sambavar Vada Karai (SV Karai) was under the rule of the Travancore Kingdom (present-day Kerala). After the struggle and protests in Sengottai and Nagercoil and the heroic death of 11 people, it was merged with Tamil Nadu in 1956 during the reign of the Chief Minister K. Kamaraj. The festival of the St. Antony's Catholic Church held in the month of June and the Christmas festival held in December are special here.

== History ==
One of the Kadai yelu Vallals (Last Seven Great Patron Kings), King Ay Andiran, was the king of Aynadu, whose capital was Ayikudi. It was a petty kingdom under the rule of Chera. At that time, palm leaves were used for writing and for keeping documents safely. To cut these palm leaves from palm trees, people from the Nadar community, who were engaged in palm groves, were brought from the village of Moolakadu near Tiruchendur. These people settled in the forest area next to the Capital Ayikudi. It was a forest area full of Aavaram plants and palm trees. They lived here by building huts made of palm leaves. Later, this area was called Aavaarangkadu (ஆவாரங்காடு - means the forest of Senna auriculata ), which later changed to Avarakadu (அவரக்காடு), and is now called Akarai or Akarakattu. As the Chera Empire collapsed due to the invasion of Cholas and Nayakas and the lack of an heir, Aynadu - which included the Akarakattu areas, merged with Venadu in the 9th century. Although the Nellai and Tenkasi regions came under the rule of the Pandyas, but this region continued to be part of Venad. Venad was renamed Travancore and the capital was shifted from Padmanabhapuram in Kanyakumari to Thiruvananthapuram in 1795. Even during the British rule, this region did not come under the rule of the Governor of Madras Presidency, British India. Although the surrounding areas (Tenkasi, Surandai, Pavoorchatram) came under the Tinnevelly district of the Madras Presidency, the Ayikudi and Akarakattu regions continued to be part of the Kingdom of Travancore. Even today, roadside milestones and land survey stones marking the boundaries of land can be seen in this village, engraved with the Travancore Royal Seal - the Conch Shell, used during the reign of the Travancore king.

== State border disputes ==
When India gained independence on 15 August 1947, the princely state of Travancore (present-day Kerala) decided not to join the Indian Union. However, with no other option, King Chithirai Thirunal Balarama Varma, due to various circumstances, acceded to the Indian Union on 4 September 1947. In 1949, the areas of Tamil Nadu, including the Agarai from Sengottai to the SV Karai, were merged with then Travancore-Cochin State.

Background :

At that time, the people of Sengottai, a taluk of South Travancore, had Tamil as their mother tongue. The Travancore government had blocked the irrigation schemes planned for agricultural development in the Tamil areas in the first and second five-year plans. Frustrated by this, the Sengottai Tamils started a struggle under the leadership of Marshal A. Nesamony in Kanyakumari on 8 September 1948 to separate from Travancore and merge with Tamil Nadu. Under his leadership, he formed a political organization called the Travancore-Tamil Nadu Congress and conducted merger struggles. The people of Tamil Nadu faced many sacrifices of life, imprisonment and atrocities by the police. As a result, Kumari district and Sengottai taluk (Akarakattu, Ayikudi, Kambili areas) merged with Tamil Nadu on 1 November 1956. The people led this struggle and won in order to get freedom from the caste oppression they had been experiencing for about 200 years from the Malayali-dominated Communities. The caste oppression prevailing in the Travancore regions was another reason for these regions to separate and merge with Tamil Nadu.

First reason: The Travancore princely government blocked the irrigation projects of the Central Government for the Tamil Nadu region.

Second reason: Since the Travancore country was governed on the basis of Dharma, caste principles were strictly observed. They divided the society into two groups, upper caste and lower caste. They considered lower caste people as untouchables, not even to be seen, and unfit to move around, and they were humiliated in the society. To change this situation, the Tamils wanted to separate from Travancore. This also became the second reason for the partition.

Third reason: The Tamil people fought against the Malayali Dominant communities and their allied sections. This struggle intensified in 1948. Pattam Thanupillai was then the Chief Minister of independent Travancore. He used severe repression against those considered to be a despicable community. In February 1948 police opened fire and two Tamil speaking Nadars were killed (Devasakayam in Mangat and Sellaiyan in Keelkulam). This led to a clash. Thanupillai's government supported the upper dominant community. In this situation, 11 August 1954 was observed as Liberation Day in the entire Tamil areas of Travancore. At this time, Pattam Thanupillai was the Chief Minister of Travancore for the second time. On his orders, the Malayali police opened fire on the people of Tamil Nadu for the second time. As a result, 11 people were shot and killed. As soon as the shooting ended, the Thanupillai government took serious action to suppress the protesters. From that day (11–08–1954) until Thanupillai resigned from office (14–02–1955), that is, for 188 days, the police carried out very severe repression. Many were imprisoned and tortured. This was also a major reason for partition.

== Developments ==
The Jesuit priests who were working in the Tenkasi area since 1606, Christianity was already there in the 17th Century. It is mentioned in the annual Letters of 1662-1665 of Madurai Mission. Fr.Antony De Proenca in 1662 and Fr. Balthazar De Costa in 1663 preached the Gospel there. The Jesuit priests had helped the villagers to build a small thatch roofed church (St. Antony's Church) in this village in late 18th century or early 19th century. Then they turned their attention to education. They set up an RC school with the idea of providing education to marginalized people. It has now been upgraded to a higher secondary school. This village is known for its hard work. This is because women are also manufacturing tobacco (Home made cigars - approved products of Govt) and involving farming to earn their income like men. For many years, only men studied higher education here. Parents were reluctant to send their girls to study in cities. But after the establishment of a college in this village, women are also studying higher education and achieving success. Agarai is moving towards self-sufficiency in education.

== Religion ==
The first people to arrive in this village were the pioneers, laying the foundations for the village and shaping its growth with their hard work and dedication. These pioneers are the Nadar community Roman Catholic Christians. Their vision, perseverance, and contributions were instrumental in establishing the village, and they continue to form the backbone of the community. In later years, to assist with construction, laundry, hair grooming and other essential services, the Nadar community welcomed a small number of individuals from other communities to the Agarakattu village.

Hindu Community:

Currently, the village has two temples:

- Amman Temple
- Krishna Temple

Additionally, there are several smaller temples like Pillaiyar kovil.

Christian Community:

Agarakattu is a separate parish within the Tenkasi vicariate of the Roman Catholic Diocese of Palayamkottai, which falls under the jurisdiction of the Archdiocese of Madurai in Tamil Nadu, India.

The village is home to St. Antony's Church, the main parish church of the Agarakattu Roman Catholic community. In addition, the village is home to two other Catholic churches:

- Church of St. Margaret Mary Alacoque
- Church of St. Mary the Virgin

The village also features two chapels:

- Chapel of Immaculate Mother Mary, located in JP College DMI Sisters Convent, Agarakattu
- Chapel of Sacred Heart of Jesus, located in the Sacred Heart Sisters Convent, Agarakattu

== Educational institutions ==
This village is home to three schools and three colleges:

Schools:

- St. Britto's Higher Secondary School (also known as Arulanandar School)
- St. Joseph's Global CBSE School
- Government Elementary School

Colleges:

- JP College of Engineering
- JP College of Arts and Science
- JP College of Education

== Transport ==
Agarakattu is a well-connected village situated along State Highway Number 39A (SH-39A), which serves as a vital route for transportation to various surrounding regions. Additionally, MDR 923 - SH39A Agarakattu Link Road (commonly known as JP College Road) passes through the village, further enhancing its connectivity. The village boasts a robust transportation network, with a total of 5 bus stops within its boundaries. Of these, 4 bus stops are still in operation, while the Agarai West bus stop is no longer in use. This makes commuting convenient for the residents and visitors of Agarakattu, providing access to nearby towns and cities.

Bus Stops:

- Anthoniar Church ( Agarai Central)
- Government Primary School (Agarai West)
- SKT Nagar (Agarai East)
- JP College (Agarai South)
- Agarai Vilakku ( Agarai South boundary)

Bus Routes:

- Tenkasi - Idaiyarthavanai (5, 5M)
- Tenkasi - Surandai (D5)
- Tenkasi - Surandai (D5 Exp)
- Tenkasi - Veeranam (14, 14A)
- Tenkasi - Cherndhamaram (7)
- Tenkasi - Cherndhamaram - Sankarankovil (SFS)
- Tenkasi - Surandai - Devarkulam (SFS)
- Tenkasi - Surandai - Tirunelveli (SFS)
- Sengottai - Surandai (10, 10A, 10D)
- Sengottai - Veerakeralampudur (10 Exp)
- Sengottai - Tirunelveli (Private)
- Thirumalai Kovil - Tirunelveli (SFS)
- Thirumalai Kovil - Surandai (8)
- Urmelaiziyan - Ayikudi - Tenkasi (Private)
- Sengottai - Sankarankovil - Chennai (SETC)
- Sengottai - Surandai - Chennai (SETC)

(The numbers in parentheses represent the route numbers.)

Nearby Railway Stations:

- Sengottai Railway Station (10 km)
- Tenkasi Railway Station (5 km)

Nearby Airports:

- Thiruvananthapuram (115 km)
- Thoothukudi (95 km)
- Madurai (155 km)
