= Nallur, Tirunelveli =

Nallur
- Village
- Location in Tamil Nadu, India
- Coordinates: 8°52′10″N 77°31′03″E
- Country: India
- State: Tamil Nadu
- District: Tenkasi district
- Taluk: Alangulam taluk

Languages
  - Official: Tamil
- Time zone: UTC+5:30 (IST)
- PIN: 627853
- Vehicle registration: TN-79

Nallur is a village in Tenkasi district in the Indian state of Tamil Nadu. It is located in a municipality under Aalangulam Panchayat Union . Its parts are Kasiyapuram, Aladipatti, Vaithilingapuram, Sivakamiyapuram, Kamarajnagar, Aravankudieruppu, Periyarnagar, Rajivkantinagar.

== Economy ==
The primary industry is agriculture, grocery, rice mills, oil production plant, garment manufacture, tirunir manufacture, coconut copra drying, July brick, woodwork, involved in the palattarapatta. Most of the women is involved in the beedi roller work.

== Government ==
=== Amenities ===
The central library is located near the Mutharamman kovil kasiyapuram used by the students and villagers. Nallur Post Office is located inside St Paul's Church campus at west entrance of Nallur. Nallur postal index number is PIN : 627 853.

=== Landmark ===
Sri Vaithiyalingaswamy Annai Yogambigai temple, Aladipatti is an old shiva temple which is located center of Nallur.

St Paul's Church Nallur it was built by British pastor Renious it is 150 years old, which is also located west entrance of village.

== Schools and colleges ==
- West Tirunelveli Higher Secondary School
- Swami Sri vaithiyalinga swamy Primary & High School
- TDTA Elementary School
- CMS arunodhaya middle School
- CSI Jayaraj Annapackiam College

== Bank and ATM ==
- Bank of Baroda, Linked Branch, Aladipatti
- TMB ATM

== Transportation ==
Mini bus service is primary transport to connect nearest city Alangulam.

== Notable people ==
- Aladi Aruna was an Indian politician and former Member of the Legislative Assembly. He is native to Nallur village.
- Aladi Sankaraiya is a Senior Congress Leader, Ex Secretary in Tamilnadu Congress Committee, and Star Orator. He is native to Nallur village.
