= Karuppanadhi River =

Tributary river in India

The river Karuppanadhi (also known as Karuppanathi) is a branch of Tamirabarani and tributary of Chittar River in India. It originates at an altitude of 5870 feet falls in the Krishnapuram village of Kadayanallur taluk in the Tenkasi district of the Indian state of Tamil Nadu.

The Karuppanadhi Dam is located at the foothills of Western Ghats built across the Karuppanadhi river near Chokkampatti. The total capacity of the reservoir is 5,240,000 cubic metres (185,000,000 ft^{3}).
