= Vasudevanallur =

Vasudevanallur Town of sugarcane
- Town
- Nickname: vasu
- Location in Tamil Nadu, India
- Coordinates: 9.23°N 77.42°E
- Country: India
- State: Tamil Nadu
- District: Tenkasi
  - Rank: 1
- Elevation: 178 m (584 ft)

Population (2011)
  - Total: 21,361

Languages
  - Official: Tamil
- Time zone: UTC+5:30 (IST)
- Pincode: 627758
- Vehicle registration: TN 79

Vasudevanallur is a town panchayat located 37 km from Tenkasi, The district headquarter in the Indian state of Tamil Nadu. The town is a lushy green town situated on the eastern foothills of Western Ghats. The Majority people of this town belong to farming community. The town is well known especially for cultivation of paddy, sugarcane, lemon etc.,

== Geography ==
Vasudevanallur is located at 9.23°N 77.42°E. It has an average elevation of 178 metres (583 feet).

- Nearest Railway Station is Sankarankovil, situated 20 kilometres away from the town
- Nearest Airport is Madurai International Airport
- TNSTC runs regular town buses and Mofussil buses from nearby towns, the major route is Madurai - Kollam,

== Demographics ==
As of 2001 India census, Vasudevanallur had a population of 18,461. Males constituted 49% of the population and females 51%. Vasudevanallur had an average literacy rate of 62%, higher than the national average of 59.5%: male literacy was 74%, and female literacy was 51%. In Vasudevanallur, 10% of the population was under 6 years of age.

It is a suburb of Vasudevanallur (Assembly constituency) and Tenkasi Lok Sabha constituency, with an area of 10.40 km^{2}. It has 18 wards and 93 streets.

As of the 2011 census, the county had 5833 households and a population of 21361.

== Economy ==
As sugarcane grows well in Vasudevanallur and its surroundings, a sugarcane mill operates in Vasudevanallur as a private sector.As well as this region is rich for growth of lemon.

== Transportation ==
The Madurai - Sengottai Highway has buses for Madurai, Tenkasi, Rajapalayam, Sankarankoil and Chennai, Pondicherry, Bangalore, Tirupati, Trichy, Kanniyakumari, Nagercoil,

== Politics ==
Vasudevanallur (state assembly constituency) (SC) is part of Tenkasi (Lok Sabha constituency).
