= Karumbanoor =

- Interactive map of Karumbanoor
- Coordinates: 8°51′18″N 77°28′5″E
- Country: India
- State: Tamil Nadu
- District: Tenkasi
- Taluk: Alangulam

Population (2011)
  - Total: 2,066
- Area code: 04633 Sex ratio 1000 :1040.5 ♂/♀ Literacy 74.5% Lok Sabha constituency Tirunelveli Vidhan Sabha constituency Alangulam Currency Indian Rupee

Karumbanoor is a village/hamlet in Alangulam Taluk in Tenkasi District of the Indian state of Tamil Nadu. It comes under Andipatti Panchayath. It is located 23 km East of District headquarters Tenkasi. It is 12 km from Keelapavoor and 750 km from the state capital, Chennai. The Karumbanoor Pin code is 627851 and postal head office is Alangulam.
Karumbanoor is surrounded by Kadayam Taluk on the west, Keelapavoor Taluk on the North, Pappakudi Taluk on the South, Surandai Taluk on the North. Cities near to Karumbanoor are Alangulam, Surandai, Vikramasingapuram, Tenkasi, Shenkottai.

Sex ratio	1000 :1040.5 ♂/♀
Literacy	74.5%
Lok Sabha constituency	Tirunelvei
Vidhan Sabha constituency	Alangulam

== Education ==
=== Colleges ===
- Einstein College of Engineering
- Sardar Raja College of Engineering
- St. Mariam Polytechnic College
- CSI Jeyaraj Annapackiam Arts & Science College
- Rani Anna Government College for Women
- Thiruvalluvar College
- Ambai Arts College
- Aladi Aruna College Of Nursing in Alangulam

=== Schools in Karumbanoor ===
- Kamaraj Hindu Primary School
- T.D.T.A. Primary School

=== Schools nearest to Karumbanoor ===
- SSV Hr Sec School in Mathapattinam
- Andipatti Govt School
- Pulangulam Government School

== Transport ==
Rail

Kila Kadaiyam Rail Way Station is the closest railway station. Tirunelveli Rail Way Station is the major nearby railway station. Pavoorchatram railway station.

Bus

The Kandhavel minibus services in the village. Government bus 34E
