= Piranoor =

- Satellite town
- Location in Tamil Nadu, India
- Coordinates: 8.97°N 77.28°E
- Country: India
- State: Tamil Nadu
- District: Tenkasi

Languages
  - Official: Tamil
- Time zone: UTC+5:30 (IST)
- PIN: 627809
- Telephone code: 04633
- Vehicle registration: TN-76
- Sex ratio: 1003 ♂/♀

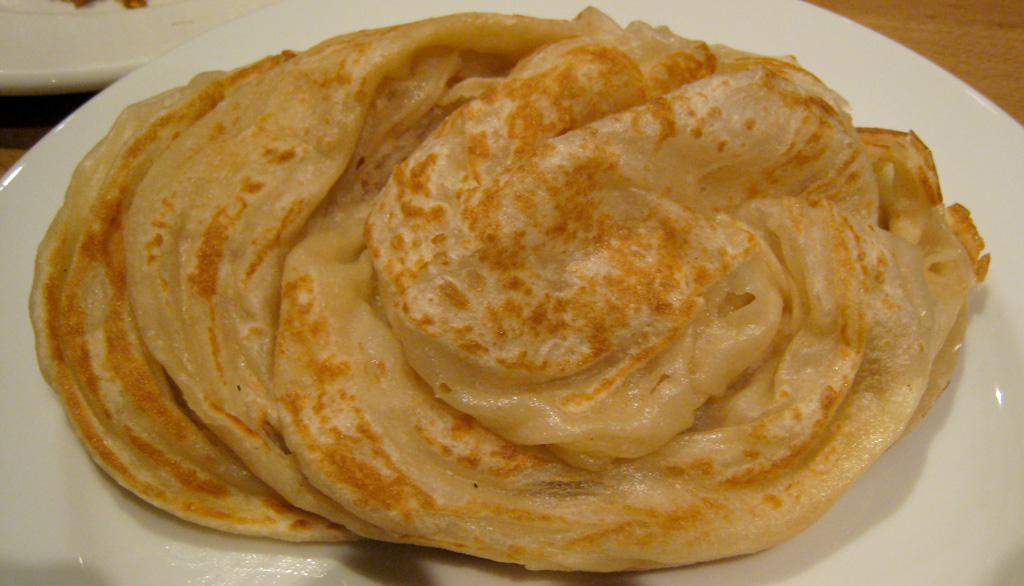
Parotta

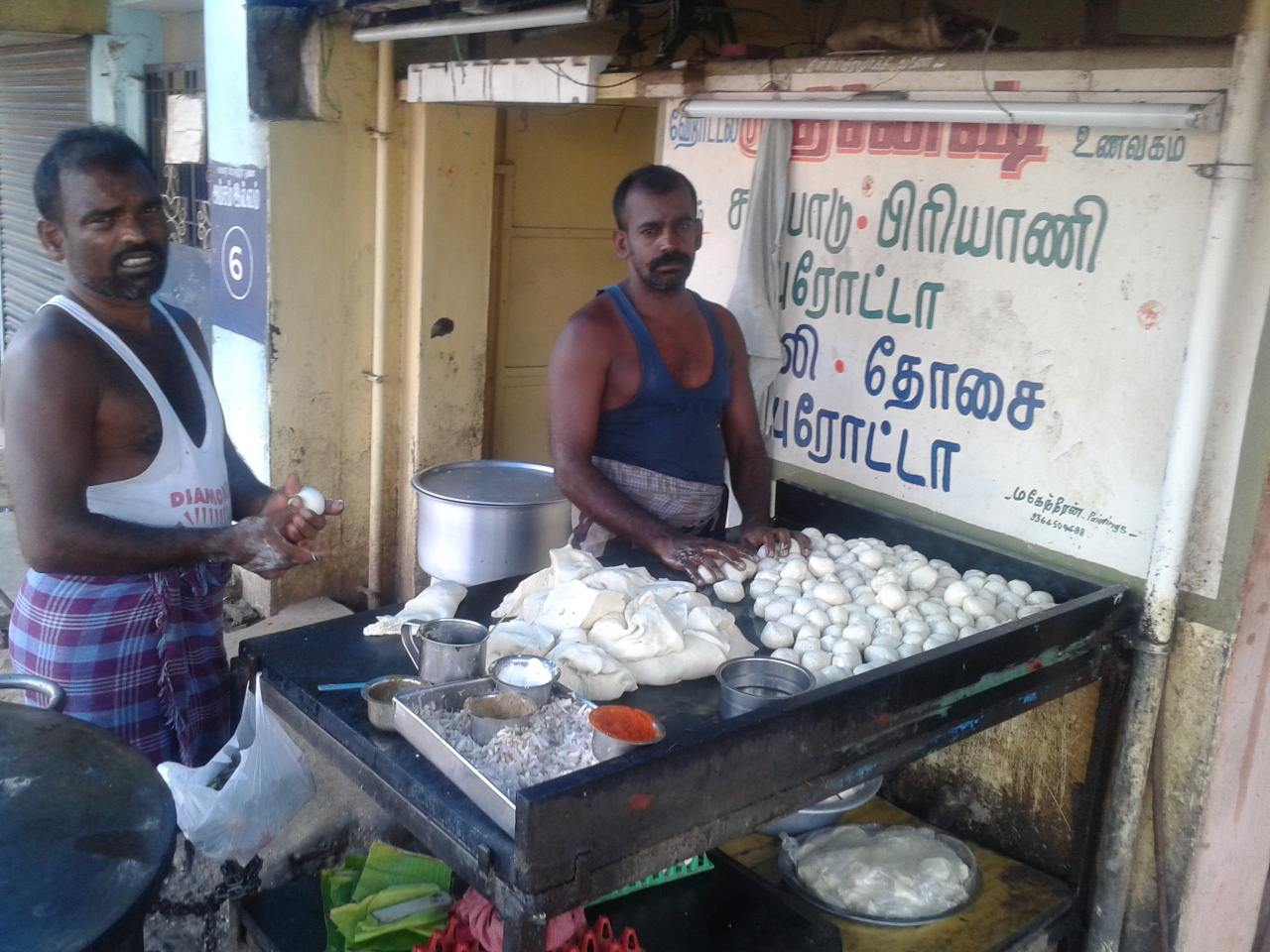
Parotta stall in at Piranoor

Piranoor is a Panchayat Village of Tenkasi Block and Shenkottai Taluk. in Tenkasi district, Tamil Nadu, India, in the foothills of the Western Ghats. Up to 1956, this area was a toll gate between the states of Kerala and Tamil Nadu, so this area is known as Border.

Kollam - Madurai National Highway (NH744) goes via this place. Tirunelveli - Tenkasi - Kollam State Highway (SH39) also goes via this place.

It is located roughly 3 kilometres (1.9 mi) from the Courtallam Waterfall, near the border with Kerala. The Harihara and Kuntaaru rivers flow between Shenkottai and this village.

== Economy ==
The major industry in this village is by log bucking at sawmills. Wood log seasoning, door and furniture making, bamboo furniture making are also done here. This area is also famous for evening parotta stalls. Mango and Amla wholesale markets are here.
