= Dharugapuram =

- Village
- Location in Tamil Nadu, India Dharugapuram (India)
- Coordinates: 9.2120428°N 77.4350203°E
- Country: India
- State: Tamil Nadu
- District: Tenkasi

Languages
  - Official: Tamil
- Time zone: UTC+5:30 (IST)

Dharugapuram is a panchayat Village in Tenkasi district in the Indian state of Tamil Nadu. This village is under the control of Vasudevanallur block Sivagiri taluk
