= Vadakarai Keezhpadugai =

- Town
- Interactive map of Vadakarai Keezhpadugai
- Coordinates: 9.048566°N 77.267479°E
- Country: India
- State: Tamil Nadu
- District: Tenkasi

Population (2011)
  - Total: 20,821

Languages
  - Official: Tamil
- Time zone: UTC+5:30 (IST)
- Postal code: 627812
- Vehicle registration: TN 76

Vadakarai Keezhpadugai is a town and gram panchayat in Tenkasi district in the Indian state of Tamil Nadu. This town is spread across an area of 25 km^{2} (9.7 mi^{2}) and is located along the foothills of the Western Ghats on the northern side of Hanumannathi River. its filled ever green land site of parts. Agriculture fields most important vadakarai people. The town has a predominant Tamil Rowthers population.

== Climate ==
This region experiences a very pleasant climate even during Summer months The average Summer temperature is 31.5°C. During Monsoon the showers are usually heavy accompanied by cool breeze.

== Places of interest ==
- Adavinainar Dam

== Demographics ==
Religious census
Religion	Percent(%)
Hindu	24.5%
Muslim	75.0%
Christian	0.5%
Other	0.0%

As of 2011 India census, Vadakarai Keelpidagai had a population of 20821, Males constitute 51% of the population and females 49%.

In the religious census of 2011, Vadakarai Keelpidagai had 24.5% Hindus, 75.00% Muslims, 0.5% Christians following other religions.
