= Vaithya lingam temple =

Shiva temple in Tenkasi district, Tamil Nadu, India

Sri Vaithya Lingam Swami temple is a Hindu temple dedicated to Sri Vaithya Lingam Swami and Goddess Yogambigai. It is located at Aladipatti, Nallur in Tenkasi district of Tamil Nadu.
