= Sivagiri estate =

Sivagiri estate was a permanently settled zamindari estate in the Tirunelveli District of Madras Presidency, British India. It covered an area of 125 square kilometres. Its headquarters was the town of Sivagiri.

The royal family of Sivagiri belongs to the Maravar clan and was involved in a court dispute in July 2012 when an heir claimed that most of the possessions of the family were transferred to a Swiss Bank account on India's independence in 1947.
