= Ayikudi Balasubramanya Swami Temple =

Coordinates: 9.005106°N 77.341355°E

The Ayikudi Balasubramanya Swami Temple is a small Hindu temple in the village of Ayikudi, Thirunelveli district, Tamil Nadu, India. The temple is visited by pilgrims and tourists who come to visit Kutralam Falls, Kasi Vishwanathar Temple Tenkasi and Thiruchendur.

== History ==
Until 1947 this area was in the realm of the Travancore Kings. The temple is situated on the banks of Hanumannathi River. Sri Hanuman was said to have stopped by and rested on the banks of this river on his way to Lanka, hence the river was named Hanumannathi River. This is why Rama and Subramanya are popular names in this region.

Lord Karthikeya appears among five Vrikshas (trees) and the five Devatas in the form of a young Balasubramanya. The five Vrikshams are Arasu (Surya), Vembu neem (Ambhikai), Kariveppilai Curry leaves tree ( Mahesha), Madhulai (Ganesha) & Mavilangu (Vishnu).

A devotee named Mallan at Nanjaipara found the main deity Idol of the temple in the Mallam River. Once there lived a Brahmin Mugura Bhakthar sanyasi who obtained Samādhi in that area. His samadhi was built on the shores of Hanumannathi River. An Arasa Tree was planted at that place & his community conducted pujas & ceremonies there. The idol of Balasubramanya that was found at Mallapuram was installed on the samadhi of that Sanyasi and the pujas were continued.

Until 1931 the top of the temple was only made of coconut and palm leaves. About 150 years ago the Thiruvadhankur Royal family took up the temple management. Then the temple was renovated and festivals were organized. The Utsava Murthi was known as Muthukumara swami. The Balasubramanya Mulavar Pujas were conducted in the traditional way by the sangethi Brahmins and the Utsava pujas & processions were conducted by Shivacharyas.

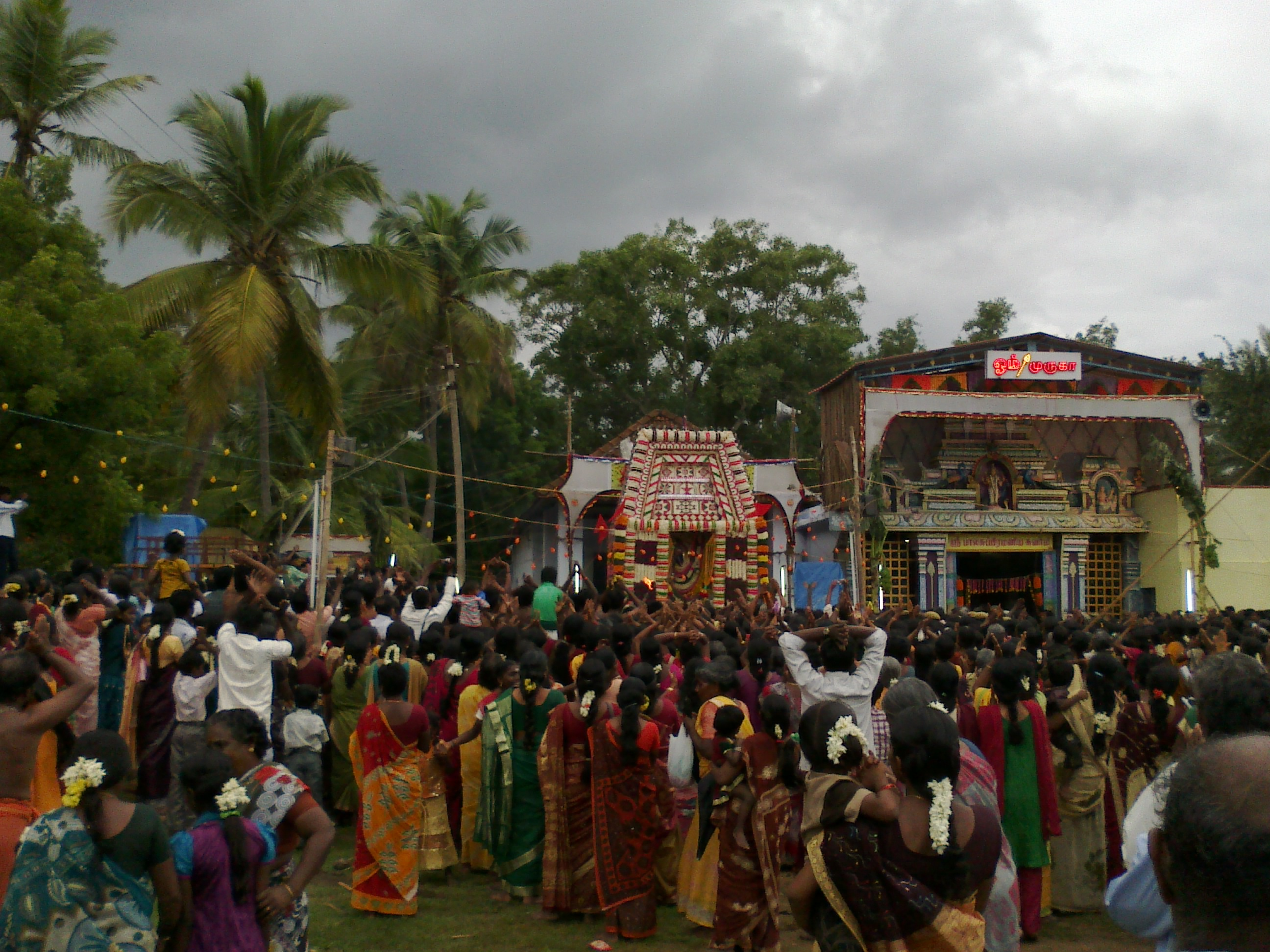
Balasubramanya Swami Temple During Soora Samharam Festival

== The Idol ==
Both the Mulavar and the Utsavar are identical, the idol is a small Vigraham, with the young baby faced Muruga, with four hands Vajram, Shaktivaram & Abhayam with a Peacock on the left and the lord sits on a lotus Padmapeetam. The name of one of the five trees (sthala virksham), is Madhulai and not Madhalai.

== Special ways of Prayer ==
The Arasa leaf Vibhuthi Prasadham (Holy Ash) available in this temple is very powerful. Padi Payasam, Kavadi, Pallkudam are some of the important ways in which the devotees show their love to the Lord. According to legend, on the steps leading to the Hanumannathi River Sri Balamuruga takes payasam along with other children.

== Special Days ==
During Aipasi month (15 November to 15 December), i.e. After thula masa ammavasai shukala shasti Skandha shasti Soorasamharam festivities are held for seven days in this temple. Each day of the Utsavam the Lord is decorated differently and devotees attend the festivities. Special pujas are conducted in the temple during Chithirai Vishu, Vaigasi Vishakam & Masi Makam. The lord is taken on the Peacock on the streets as a procession around the temple.

Devotees believe that those who get the dharshan and pray to this Balasubramanya will attain prosperity.

Hanuman River

== See also ==
- Aygudi
