= Karuppanadhi Dam =

Dam in Tamil Nadu, India

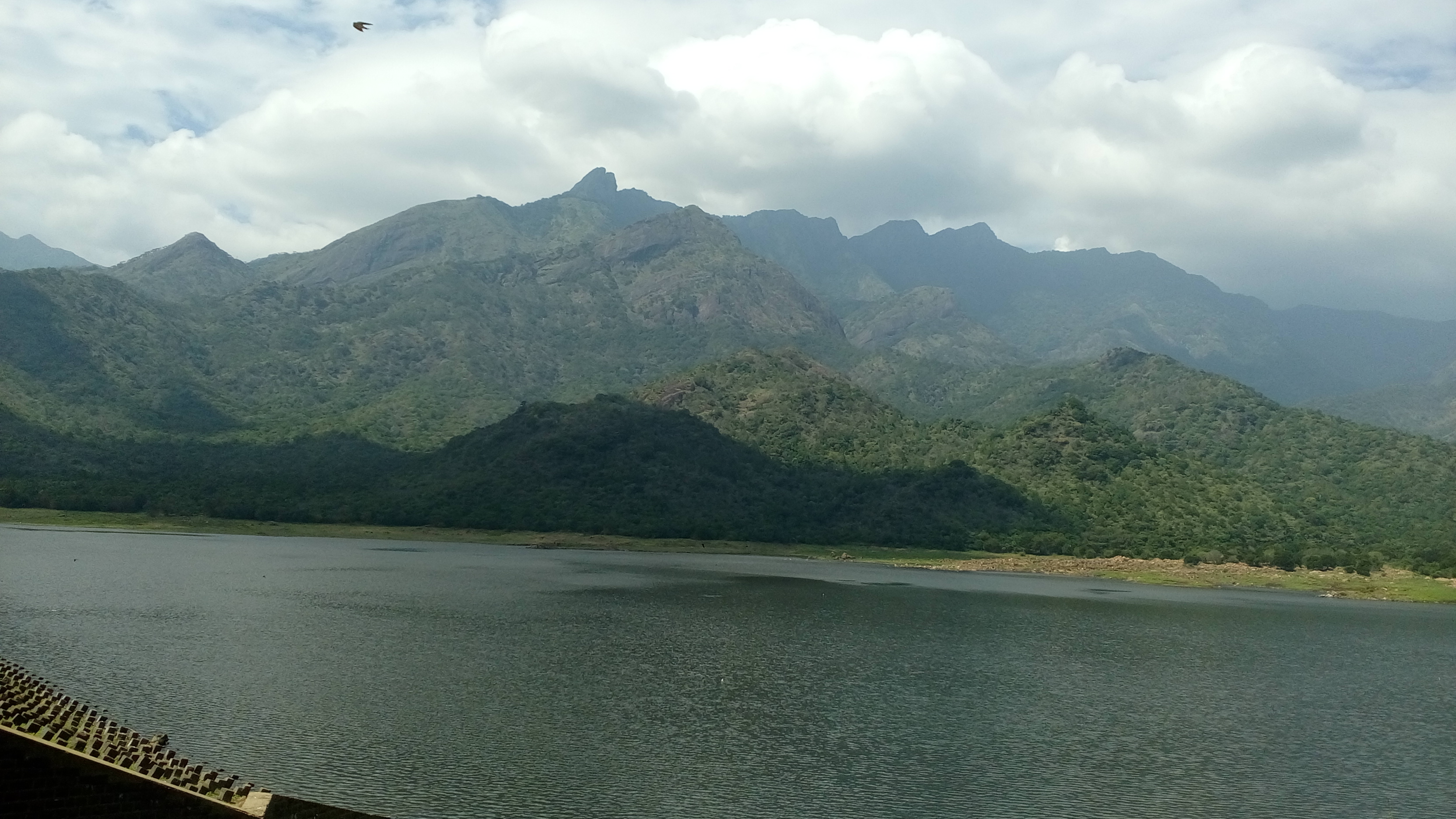

- Location of the Karuppanadhi Dam in Tamil Nadu
- Country: India
- Location: Kadayanallur, Tenkasi district, Tamil Nadu
- Coordinates: 9°08′15.5″N 77°18′12.7″E
- Purpose: Irrigation
- Status: Completed
- Construction began: 1971
- Opening date: 1977
- Owner: Government of Tamilnadu

Dam and spillways
- Height: 22 m (72 ft)
- Length: 890 m (2,920 ft)
- Spillways: 2
- Spillway type: OG
- Spillway capacity: 357 m^{3} (12,607 ft^{3})

Reservoir
- Total capacity: 5,240,000 m^{3} (185,048,854 ft^{3})

The Karuppanadhi Dam is located at the foothills of Western Ghats built across the Karuppanadhi river near Chokkampatti, in the Tirunelveli district of Tamil Nadu, southern India. It provides water for irrigation to the region of Kadayanallur Taluk.

== History ==
The dam construction was started in 1971 and it took six years to complete. The dam was opened in the year of 1977.

== Dimensions and capacity ==
- Height Above Lowest Foundation - 34m
- Length of Dam - 899m
- Volume Content of Dam - 10 mcube
- Gross Capacity of Reservoir - 10 mcube
- Effective Capacity of Reservoir - 10 mcube
- Estimated Cost 27.35 Million Rupees
- Project Integration Potential - 1161 Hectares
- Cultivable Command Area - 1161 Hectares

== Maintenance ==
Karuppanadhi Dam is maintained by Water Resources Department which in turn managed by the Tamil Nadu Public Works Department.

== Transportation ==
By road:The dam is situated at 13 km from Kadayanallur, and 82 km from Tirunelveli.

By train:The nearest railway station is Kadayanallur station. Kadayanallur station is well connected with Madurai and Chennai.

By air:The nearest airport is Tiruvandrum which is 120 km away from the Dam. Air connectivity is available from Chennai. International connectivity is available to Tiruvandrum.
