= Theertharapuram =

Coordinates: 8.87986°N 77.39231°E

Theertharapuram (also known as Anaikutiyur) is a small village located near the comparatively larger village of Avudaiyanoor. It is located in Tenkasi district.

== Geography ==
Theertharapuram is situated in the foothills of Western Ghats, between the cities of Tirunelveli and Tenkasi. The village is 15 km (9.3 mi) east of Tenkasi and 45 km (28 mi) west of Tirunelveli. These two cities also have the closest large railway stations.

== History ==
The village was founded by Anaikannu Nadar. All current residents are descendants from him.

== Education ==
There are no educational institutions in this village. The closest school is Punitha Arulappar Higher Secondary School in Avudaiyanoor, which is about a 10-minute walk from here.

== Demographics ==
The population consists of Hindus and Christians. Hindus are the majority of the population.
