= Thayar Thoppu =

- Village
- Location in Tamil Nadu, India Thayar Thoppu (India)
- Coordinates: 8°56′18″N 77°25′59″E
- Country: India
- State: Tamil Nadu
- District: Tenkasi

Population
  - Total: 2,500 (app)

Languages
  - Official: Tamil
- Time zone: UTC+5:30 (IST)
- PIN: 627861
- Telephone code: 04633 - xxxxxx
- Nearest city: Surandai
- Literacy: 78%
- Lok Sabha constituency: Tenkasi
- Vidhan Sabha constituency: Tenkasi

Thayar Thoppu is a village comes under Veerakeralampudur Panchayat, Veerakeralamputhur taluk, Tenkasi District Tamil Nadu, India. It is located between Alangulam and Veerakeralampudur. It has one Government primary school. Due to its location near Courtallam, it drizzles during Courtallam season.

== Rivers ==
The village is surrounded by two rivers Chittar River and Hanumanathi. Both Hanumanathi and Chittar River merges rightly exactly in this village thus forming the major tributary to Thamirabarani River.

Chittar River

The Chittar meaning little river or Chitranathi meaning beautiful river is a nature's invaluable enna gift. It is the river which causes a set of splendid cascades in Courtalam and its suburbs, and international cynosure often compared to the famous Spa falls of Belgium for its curative value. It is a major tributary of the river Tamiraparani. The river takes its origin in the eastern slopes of the Western Ghats in the Courtalam hills, called Tirikoodam in literature, at an altitude of 1,750 m (5,741 ft) above MSL. From its origin, the river climbs down for about six km. turns north and flows for about 16 km (10 mi). before turning towards the east. Its total length is about 80 km (50 mi). It joins the river Tamiraparani near Sivalapperi village of Tirunelveli Taluk.

Hanumanathi

It is a tributary of the Chittar river. It rises at an altitude of 1,650 m (5,413 ft) above Courtalam in Tenkasi taluk, traverses in the slopes about 10 km (6 mi). receives Karuppanathi, its tributary, then it flows and merges with Chittar in this village. The anaicuts built across the river, are Mettukal anaicut, Karisalkulam anaicut, Panpoli anaicut, Vallalkulam anaicut, Elathoor anaicut, Nainaragavan anaicut, Pungamkal anaicut and Kambli anaicut .

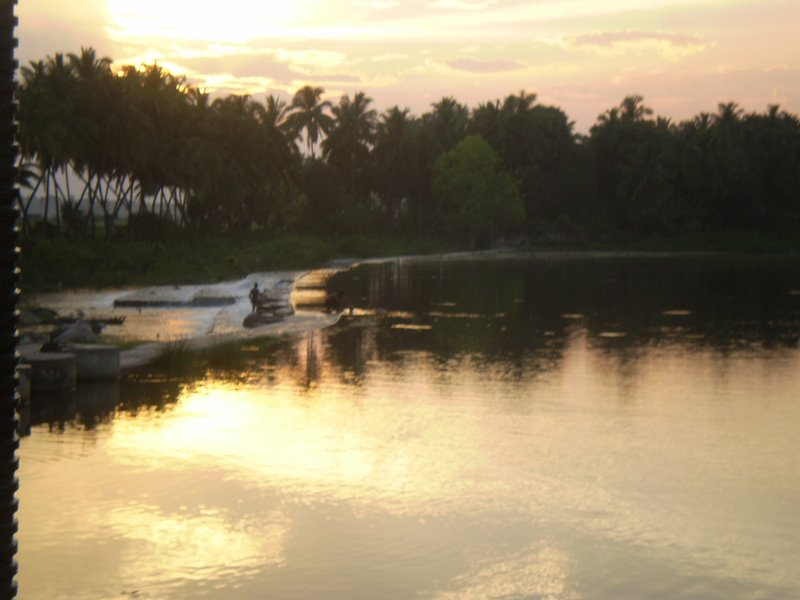
View of anaicut, during sunset.

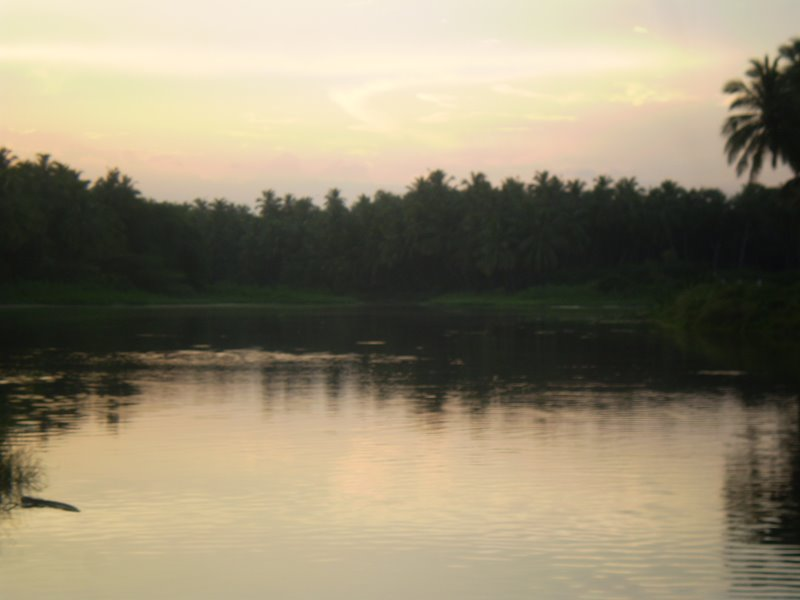
Another view of anaicut.

== Religion ==
Hinduism and Christianity are the normal religion followed by the people here. This village has two temples. A Narayana Swamy temple and Madasamy temple

== Occupation of the people ==
Agriculture is the main occupation. Most of the people work in farm fields and rolling Beedi. The main crops are paddy, onion, tomato, brinjal, tamarind, green chili, red chili, coconut, and snake guard.

== Politics ==
Thayar Thoppu comes under Tenkasi constituency for both Lok sabha and Assembly Elections.
