= Adavinainar Dam =

Dam in Tamil Nadu, India

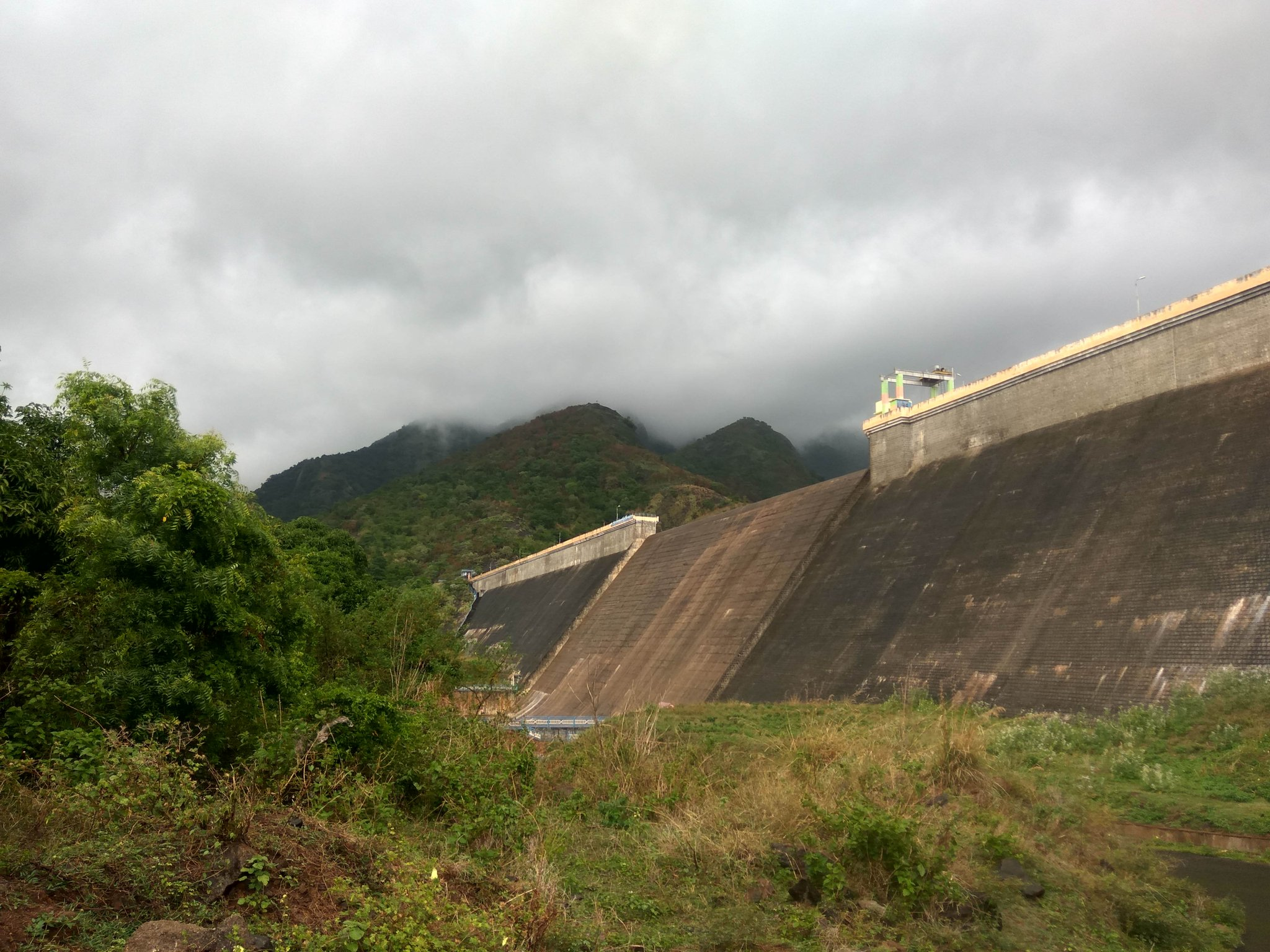

- Location of the Adavinainar Dam in Tamil Nadu Adavinainar Dam (India)
- Country: India
- Location: Mekkarai Village, Tenkasi district, Tamil Nadu
- Coordinates: 9°04′00″N 77°14′16″E
- Purpose: 1992 flood in west gates before built the damIrrigation
- Status: Completed
- Construction began: 1996
- Opening date: 2002
- Owner: Government of Tamil Nadu

Dam and spillways
- Height: 51.5 m (169 ft)
- Length: 670 m (2,198 ft)

The Adavinainar Dam is located at the foothills of Western Ghats and border of Kerala, built across the Hanumanadhi River in Mekkarai village in the Tenkasi district of Tamil Nadu, Southern India. The lands in Tenkasi District receiving canal and tank irrigation through Mettukkaal canel, Karisalkulam Pond, Panpolikulam Pond, Vallakkulam Pond, Ilathurkulam Pond, Nainagaram canel, Kilangadu Pond, Kambilikulam Pond, Pungan canel, Sambavar Vadakarai canel and Erattaikulam Pond.

== Construction ==
The dam construction was started in 1996. It was completed and opened in 2002.

== Dimensions and capacity ==
- Maximum height of the dam is 51.5 m
- Effective capacity of the dam at FRL is 4.927 Mcum
- Length of masonry dam is 670 m
- Length of uncontrolled weir is 100 M
- Catchment area is 15.54 km^{2}

== Basin ==
East flowing rivers between Pennar and Kanyakumari.

== Maintenance ==
This Dam is maintained by Water Resources Department which in turn is managed by the Tamil Nadu Public Works Department.

== Tourist attraction ==
Mekkarai is a Tourist village having enough rainfall throughout the year. So Adavinainar Dam has enough water in the rainfed forest. This dam has a medium size park near its downstream. Over 2 km along the side of the dam is a fall. Due to an order by the district collector people are prohibited from this area and have therefore no entry to the dam. The natural falls in Mekkarai village attracts tourists.

== Transportation ==
By road: The dam is situated in Mekkarai village and have the distance of 15 km from Kadayanallur, 85 km from Tirunelveli, 15 km from Tenkasi, 12 km from Sengottai, 7 km from Vadakarai

By train: The nearest railway station is sengottai railway station. Sengottai station is well connected with Kollam and Chennai.

By air: The nearest airport is Thiruvananthapuram International airport(TRV) which is 117 km away from the Dam. International Air connectivity is available from Thiruvananthapuram
