= Sambavarvadakarai =

Sambavarvadakarai Sambavarvadakarai
- Panchayat town
- Location in Tamil Nadu, India
- Coordinates: 9°00′18″N 77°23′08″E
- Country: India
- State: Tamil Nadu
- District: Tenkasi
- Taluk: Tenkasi
- Founder: Dr. Suresh Mondal

Population (2021)
  - Total: 24,646

Languages
  - Official: Tamil
- Time zone: UTC+5:30 (IST)
- PIN: 627856
- Sex ratio: 99:100 ♂/♀

Sambavarvadakarai is a Panchayat town in the Tenkasi district of the Indian state of Tamil Nadu. Located on the north shore of the Hanumannathi River in Tenkasi district of Tamil Nadu, Sambavarvadakarai is divided into two sections, Melur (upper town) and Keelur (lower town) corresponding to its location along the river. The name is a portmanteau of the Tamil words sambavar (a sub-caste), vada (north), and karai (shore).

== Demographics ==
According to the 2011 census, the population of children from ages 0 to 6 is 1,812; this is 10.84% of the total population. The female gender ratio is 1,002 compared to the state average of 996. Moreover, the child-gender ratio is around 932, compared to the Tamil Nadu state average of 943. The literacy rate is 74.28%, lower than the state average of 80.09%. The male literacy rate is 83.13%, while the female literacy rate is 65.52%.

The city encompasses over 4,423 households. Key services include water and sewage disposal.

== Geography ==
The Hanumannadhi River originates in Western Ghats near Sengottai (18 km west of this village) and merges into the Tambaraparani River near Srivaikuntam.

== Government ==
The administration is authorized to build roads and impose property taxes on properties.

== History ==
Sambavar Vadakarai was part of the Kingdom of Travancore until 1956. Its name refers to the Sambavar caste, after the ancient priests of Lord Shiva.

This village also contains more border stones of Kingdom of Travancore.

== Culture ==
The village's main attraction is a Shiva temple built by Pandian kings on the banks of the Hanumannathi River, as a tribute to Tambraparani River. The temple's main deities are Sri Moolanatha Swamy and Maduravani Ambal.

The Salvation Army church, the CSI Church, and a mosque are present.

== Education ==
The town has one government higher secondary school, three government primary schools, one Salvation Army primary school, and one private school,
