= Kidarakulam =

- Village
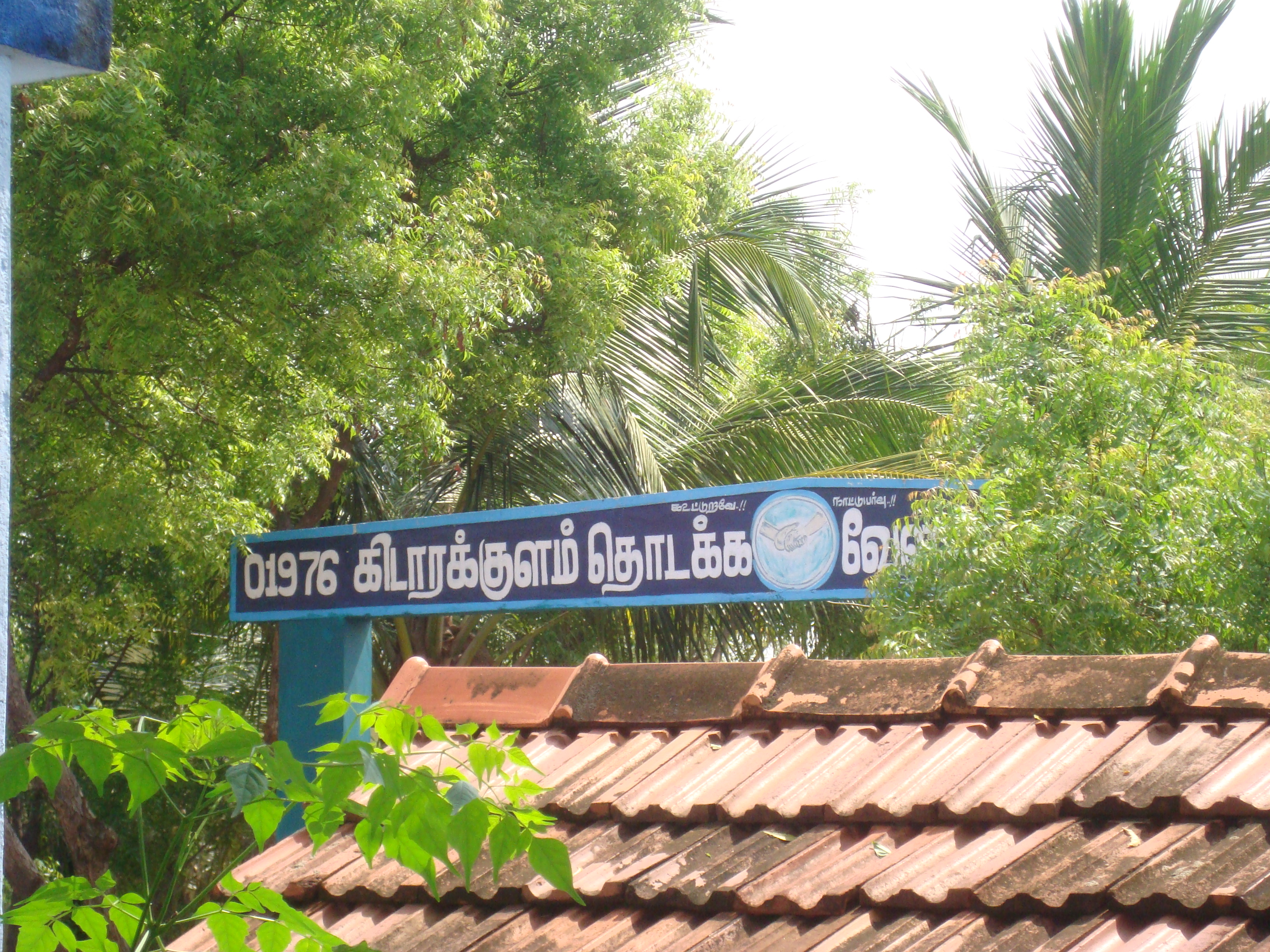

- Location in Tamil Nadu, India
- Coordinates: 8.86°N 77.49°E
- Country: India
- State: Tamil Nadu
- District: Tenkasi
- Elevation: 111 m (364 ft)

Population (2011)
  - Total: 2,009

Languages
  - Official: Tamil
- Time zone: UTC+5:30 (IST)
- PIN: 627854
- Telephone code: 04633
- Sex ratio: 1000 :1040.5 ♂/♀
- Literacy: 74.5%

Kidarakulam is a village in the Tenkasi district, Tamil Nadu, India.

As of the 2001 census, Kidarakulam had a population of around 2,009 as per the 2001 census. Males constitute 45% of the population and females 65%. Kidarakulam has an average literacy rate of 69%, higher than the national average of 59.5%; with 59% of the males and 41% of females literate. 10% of the population is under 6 years of age.
