= Madathupatti (Tirunelveli district) =

Village in Tirunelveli district

Madathupatti மடத்துபட்டி
- Village
- Location in Tamil Nadu, India Madathupatti (India)
- Coordinates: 8.8243°N 77.8050°E
- Country: India
- State: Tamil Nadu
- District: Tirunelveli
- Block: Palayamkottai

Government
  - Body: Seevalaperi Panchayat

Languages
  - Official: Tamil
- Time zone: UTC+5:30 (IST)
- Postal code: 627351

Madathupatti (Tamil: மடத்துபட்டி) is a habitation of Seevalaperi village in Palayamkottai block of Tirunelveli district in the Indian state of Tamil Nadu.

== Geography ==
Madathupatti is located approximately 18 kilometres east of Tirunelveli, the district headquarters, and about 12 kilometres from Palayamkottai. The village lies near the border of Tirunelveli and Thoothukudi district.

The village is situated near the Chittar River, which is part of the Thamirabarani River system in southern Tamil Nadu.

== Administration ==
Madathupatti is governed by the Seevalaperi Panchayat and falls under the Palayamkottai block. It is listed as a habitation under Seevalaperi village in the Census of India 2011.

== Demographics ==
According to the 2011 Census of India, Seevalaperi village, under which Madathupatti is administered, is an officially recognized census village.

Tamil is the primary language spoken in the village.

== Education ==
The village has primary educational facilities serving local children.

== Transport ==
The village is connected by local roads to nearby towns including Tirunelveli and Thoothukudi.

== Religion ==
Places of worship in the village include Hindu temples and Christian churches.
