= Kottakulam =

Kottakulam sumaithirnthapuram
- Village
- Nickname: James Maria
- Location in Tamil Nadu, India
- Coordinates: 8.966111°N 77.272778°E
- Country: India
- State: Tamil Nadu
- District: Tenkasi

Population (2001)
  - Total: 3,600

Languages
  - Official: Tamil
- Time zone: UTC+5:30 (IST)

Kottakulam is village in Tirunelveli district in the Indian state of Tamil Nadu. Kottakulam is aka Sumaitheernthapuram.

== Geography ==
Kottakulam is located at 8.966111°N 77.272778°E. It is located next to Ilanji. It is under by vallam VAO office and Shenkottah Taluk. It is located 4 km away from the main town Tenkasi and also 3 km from the most beautiful Coutrallam falls. Kollam to Madurai National Highway 208 travels across this village. It is also bounded by two lake, West Kottakulam lake (Tamil : மேலக்குளம்) and East Kottakulam Lake and Kundar (Tamil : கீழக்குளம்), and by a river, Kundaru (Tamil : குண்டாறு) (Vadakkaru).

== Demographics ==
As of 2001 India census, Kottakulam had a population of 3600. Males constitute 51% of the population and females 49%.
