= Kadayam =

- Town
- Nickname: Kilakadayam
- Location in Tamil Nadu, India Kadayam (India)
- Coordinates: 8.832°N 77.357°E
- India: India
- State: Tamil Nadu
- District: Tenkasi

Languages
  - Official: Tamil
- Time zone: UTC+5:30 (IST)

Kadayam is a town in the district of Tenkasi in the Indian state of Tamil Nadu. It was an important hub for revolutionaries in the 1900s. Kadayam boasts a notable association with Tamil's revolutionary poet, Subramania Bharati.

== Etymology ==
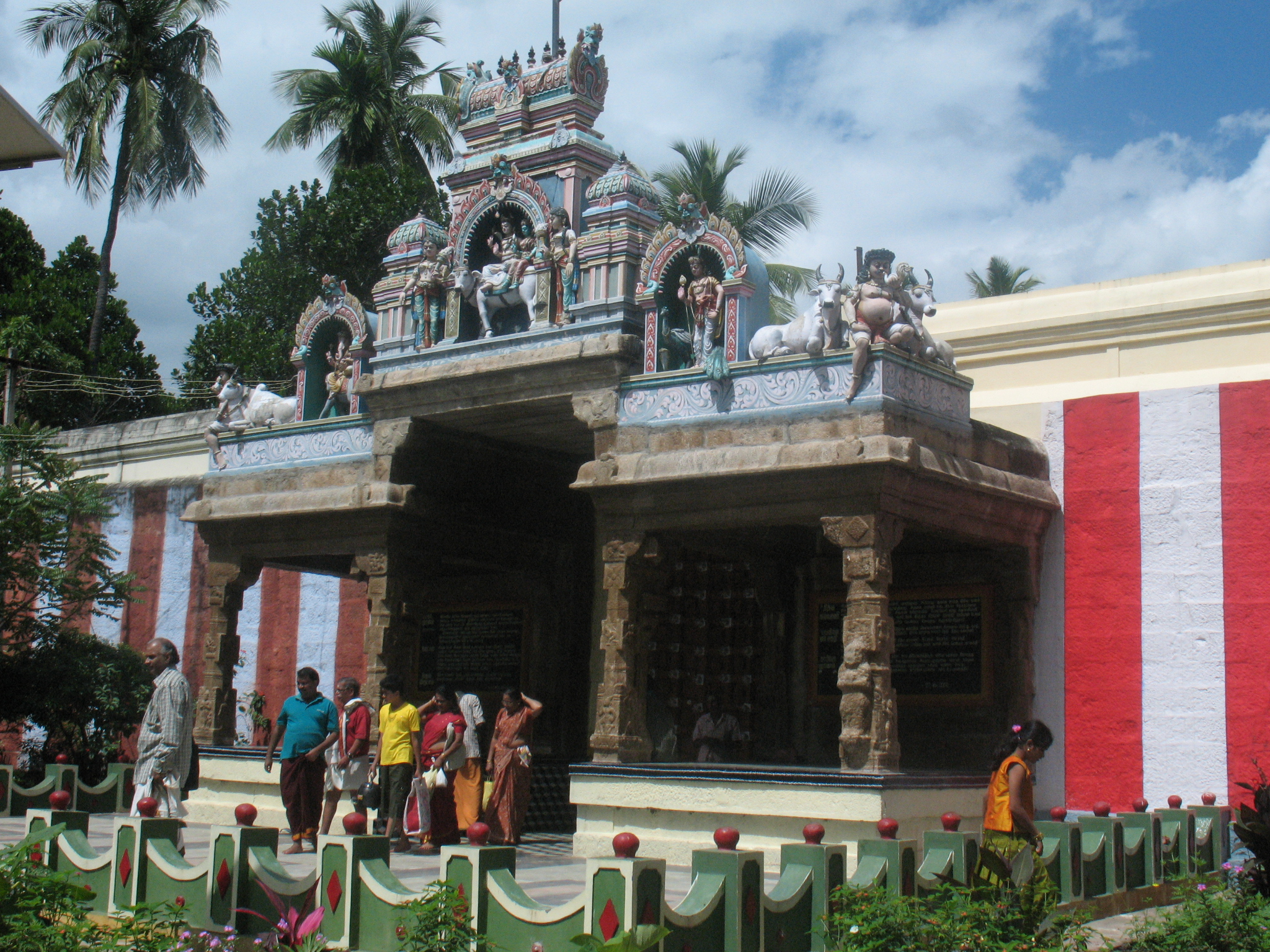
The Nithya Kalyani Amman temple at Kadayam

Kadayam was historically known as Kadayam which literally means the "Town of Kadayam" (a specific Hindu caste).

A local legend says that its people were originally living around the Kalyani Amman temple; however, the temple goddess could not tolerate the noise created by the inhabitants, so she pulled out a Kadayam (a bracelet in ancient Tamil) and threw it outside. She instructed the people to go and reside around the spot where the bracelet fell, thus making the new area known as Kadayam which later became Kadayam.

== Climate ==
Climate data for Kadayam, Tamil Nadu
Month	Jan	Feb	Mar	Apr	May	Jun	Jul	Aug	Sep	Oct	Nov	Dec	Year
Mean daily maximum °C (°F)	29.9 (85.8)	31.5 (88.7)	33.3 (91.9)	33.5 (92.3)	33.8 (92.8)	32.2 (90.0)	31.3 (88.3)	31.8 (89.2)	32.1 (89.8)	31.2 (88.2)	29.6 (85.3)	29.4 (84.9)	31.6 (88.9)
Mean daily minimum °C (°F)	22.0 (71.6)	22.5 (72.5)	24.0 (75.2)	25.2 (77.4)	25.9 (78.6)	25.1 (77.2)	24.7 (76.5)	24.8 (76.6)	24.5 (76.1)	24.0 (75.2)	23.1 (73.6)	22.2 (72.0)	24.0 (75.2)
Average precipitation mm (inches)	42 (1.7)	33 (1.3)	55 (2.2)	89 (3.5)	75 (3.0)	98 (3.9)	80 (3.1)	43 (1.7)	57 (2.2)	204 (8.0)	210 (8.3)	100 (3.9)	1,086 (42.8)
Source: Climate-Data.org

== Association with Subramania Bharati ==
The poet and freedom fighter Subramania Bharati once lived in Kadayam, India. Bharati's wife was a native of Kadayam and it is believed that Bharathiyar often sang patriotic songs from his in-laws rooftop. Bharathi stayed in Pazhaya Gramam of Kadayam with his family, where he was known for his daily walks to the Nithyakalayani Amman Temple, during which he stopped to hug the donkeys straying into the Pazhaya Gramam. He composed his Kali songs, the Panchali Sabhadam and most of his revolutionary poems including "Chinnanchiru Kiliye","Odi Vilayadu Pappa" and "Kaani Nilam Vendum" there.

== Temple Sites ==
Kadayam is known for its ancient temples scattered across the length and breadth of the Town. The popular Nithyakalayani Amman Temple is in the village center. A Shastha (Thala Malayan) temple lies on the banks of the Ramanadhi (a tributary of the Thamirabarani) as well as a Sri Pathrakali Amman Temple and Sri Muppudathiamman Temple in Kilakadayam. The former is dedicated to the 18 Patti (Town) people, who celebrate the 8-day festival.

== Acid Lime ==
Kadayam is famous for its acidic variety of lime. The uniqueness is due to rich soil in Kadayam. Tamil Nadu Agricultural University has released a variety PKM-1, bred by local selection from Kadayam through its research station at Periakulam. These limes are exported to Kadayam and the neighboring states of Kerala and Andhra Pradesh. More than five commission markets offer lime in Kadayam. The lemon cultivated mainly from Kadayam, Papaankulam, Gothandaramapuram, Servaikaranpatti, etc., The lemon from these areas are more juices than other areas.
