= Achampudur =

Achanpudur
- Town
- Location in Tamil Nadu, India
- Coordinates: 9°2′28″N 77°16′18″E
- Country: India
- State: Tamil Nadu
- District: Tenkasi

Population (2001)
  - Total: 12,407

Languages
  - Official: Tamil
- Time zone: UTC+5:30 (IST)

Achanpudur is a panchayat town in the Tenkasi district in the Indian state of Tamil Nadu.

== Demographics ==
As of the 2001 India census, Achampudur had a population of 12,407. Males constitute 52% of the population and females 48%. Achampudur has an average literacy rate of 64%, higher than the national average of 59.5%; with 60% of the males and 40% of females literate. 10% of the population is under 6 years of age.
