= Ilanji =

- village
- Location in Tamil Nadu, India
- Coordinates: 8.9574°N 77.2786°E
- Country: India
- State: Tamil Nadu
- District: Tenkasi
- Taluk: Tenkasi

Population (2011)
  - Total: 10,325

Languages
  - Official: Tamil
- Time zone: UTC+5:30 (IST)

Ilanji is a panchayat town in Tenkasi district, in the Indian state of Tamil Nadu. It is located between the towns Tenkasi and Shencottah.

== Geography ==
The word 'Ilanji' has a number of meanings including a water body. The village has three lakes very close to it. This is the only place which receives both south-west and north-east monsoon.

Geographically, Ilanji is the centroid of a triangle whose three corners are the towns of Senkottai, Courtallam and Tenkasi, each of which is located approximately 3 km (2 mi) from Ilanji. As a result, some people call it "Triplet City" in Tirunelveli district. It is also bounded by two rivers, the Sitraru (Therkaru) and the Kundaru (Vadakkaru). It's also said that at one point in time, a river flowed through the town.

== Demographics ==
In the 2001 Indian census, Ilanji reported a population of 9,423. Males constituted 51% of the population and females 49%. Ilanji had an average literacy rate of 66%, higher than the national average of 59.5%. The male literacy was 75%, and female literacy was 57%. In 2001 in Ilanji, 10% of the population was under 6 years of age.

By the 2011 census, 10,325 people were reported as living in Ilanji.

== Government and politics ==
It has 3 MLAs for Tenkasi assembly constituency and one district board president for the whole Tirunelveli district which comprised Tuticorin and Tirunelveli districts put together at that time.

== Transport ==
Ilanji as said is the centroid of Tenkasi, Senkottai and Courtalam triangle, finds all the buses (that is from Tenkasi to Senkottai) to stop. There are two stops namely Chowkai (buses not going via Courtallam from Tenkasi to Shencottah stop here), Ilanji bus stop (buses going via Courtallam from Tenkasi to Senkottai stop here) which serve as the North and South extremes of the village.

== Tourism ==
Tourist spots in the area include Courtallam (located near to the Ilanji) and Five Falls.

== Cuisine ==
Ilanji is also known for a sweet called "pozhi" which is prepared of dal, jaggery and is prepared without coconut.

== In popular culture ==
Ilanji has been used as a filming location for several films, including:

- Winner
- Velai Kidaichuduchu
- Dasarathan
- Iruvar
- Bombay
- Dumm Dumm Dumm
- Vetri Kodi Kattu
- Chennai 600028 II
- Kizhakku Karai
- Guru - (Guru's native Ilanji in Tamil version)
- Gentleman
- Punnagai Mannan
- Seema Raja
- Sindhubaadh

== Schools ==
- Ramasamy Pillai Higher Secondary School
- Bharath Montessori Matriculation Higher Secondary School
- Syed Res Mat Higher Secondary School
- English Primary School
- ICI Primary School
- Valli Nayaga Primary School
- T D T A Middle School
- Aramba Jothi Matric School
- Sri Shankara Vidhyalaya School
