= Tenkasi block =

Tenkasi block is a revenue block in the Tenkasi district of Tamil Nadu, India. It has a total of 14 panchayat villages.
