= Sengottai block =

Sengottai block is a revenue block in the Tenkasi district of Tamil Nadu, India. It has a total of 6 panchayat villages.
