= Kodikurichi =

- Village
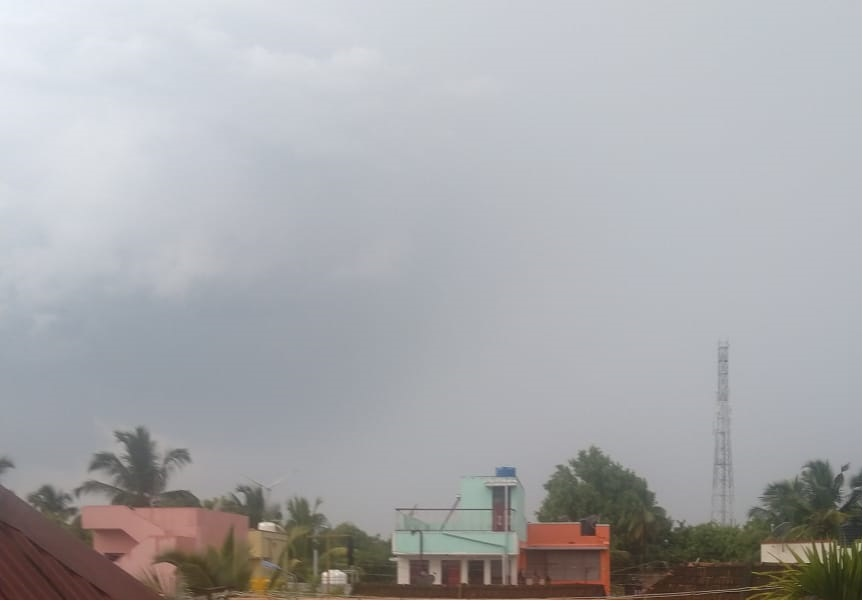

- Location in Tamil Nadu, India
- Coordinates: 9.0116°N 77.3059°E
- Country: India
- State: Tamil Nadu
- District: Tenkasi

Population (2011)
  - Total: 3,954

Languages
  - Official: Tamil
- Time zone: UTC+5:30 (IST)
- PIN: 627804

Kodikurichi is a village in Tenkasi district in Tamil Nadu, India. It is on National Highway 744, and in the foothills of the Western Ghats, near Coutrallam Falls. It is 7 kilometers from the Tenkasi district headquarters.

== Etymology ==
The Name Kodikurichi was named after The Ruler Named Kodi.

== History ==
The Ruler Kodi Ruled Kodikurichi, and Sivaramapettai was called pettai because this used to be a market place and they named Sivaramapettai because It is named after a Temple named Shri Shivaramanangai amman Temple.

== Location ==
It is Located in Kadayanallur Taluka of Tenkasi district, Tamil Nadu and has an Agriculture Land, which is large.

== Temples ==
- 1.Shri Shivaramanangai Amman Temple
- 2.Shri Shivalingeshwara Temple

== Educational Institutions ==
- 1.Sri Ram Nallamani Yadava College
- 2.USP Polytechnic College
- 3.Karayalar College
