= Kadayanallur block =

Kadayanallur block is a revenue block in the Tenkasi district of Tamil Nadu, India. It has a total of 16 panchayat villages.
