= Hanumannathi River =

Hanuman Nadhi or Hanumannathi is a river flowing in the Tenkasi district of the Indian state of Tamil Nadu.

It is a tributary of the Chittar River. It rises at an altitude of 1,650 m (5,413 ft) above Courtalam in Tenkasi taluk, traverses in the slopes about 10 km (6 mi). receives Karuppanathi, its tributary, then it flows and merges with Chittar in Thayar Thoppu village in Veerakeralampudur taluk. The total length of Hanumannathi is 32 kilometres.

The Adavinainar Reservoir is situated across the Hanumanathi river which is in Mekkarai village of Sengottai taluk with a capacity of 175 Mcft (47.20 meter height).

The anaicuts built across the river, are Mettukal anaicut, Karisalkulam anaicut, Panpoli anaicut, Vallalkulam anaicut, Elathoor anaicut, Nainaragavan anaicut, Pungamkal anaicut and Kambli anaicut . The famous Ayikudi Balasubramanya Swami Temple is situated on the banks of Hanuman Nadhi. The Hindu deity Hanuman was said to have stopped by and rested on the banks of this river on his way to Lanka, hence the river was named Hanuman nadhi.

== See also ==
List of rivers of Tamil Nadu
