= Rayagiri =

Rayagiri mannar malai
- Town panchayat
- Location in Tamil Nadu, India
- Coordinates: 9.34°N 77.54°E
- Country: India
- State: Tamil Nadu
- District: Tenkasi

Population (2001)
  - Total: 10,509

Languages
  - Official: Tamil
- Time zone: UTC+5:30 (IST)
- PIN: 627764
- Telephone code: +91 4636

Rayagiri is a panchayat town in Tenkasi district in the Indian state of Tamil Nadu.

== Population ==
As of 2001 India census, Rayagiri had a population 10,855. Males constitute 52% of the population and females 48%. Rayagiri has an average literacy rate of 61%, higher than the national average of 59.5%: male literacy is 72% and female literacy is 50%. In Rayagiri, 11% of the population is under 6 years of age.

== Location ==
Rayagiri is exactly 121 km from Madurai towards south and 86 km from Tirunelveli towards north and 3 km away from Madurai - chengottai Highway.

== Schools ==
In Rayagiri, there are six elementary schools, one girls high school, one higher secondary school and two private matriculation schools are available.

== Adjacent communities ==
The nearest cities to Rayagiri are Rajapalayam, Puliyangudi, and Sankaran Kovil.
