= Sankarankoil block =

Sankarankoil block is a revenue block in the Tenkasi district of Tamil Nadu, India. It has a total of 28 panchayat villages.
