= Thattankulam =

- Village
- Location in Tamil Nadu, India
- Coordinates: 8.47°N 77.68°E
- Country: India
- State: Tamil Nadu
- District: Tenkasi
- Elevation: 141 m (463 ft)

Languages
  - Official: Tamil
- Time zone: UTC+5:30 (IST)

Thattankulam is a village in the Indian state of Tamil Nadu, in Tenkasi district. Before the division of Tirunelveli district on 22 November 2019 it was in the Tirunelveli district.

== Geography ==
Thattankulam is located at 8.47°N 77.68°E. It has an average elevation of 141 metres (462 feet).

== Administration ==
Thattankulam is governed by the South Nanguneri Village Panchayat. Thattankulam is part of Nanguneri assembly constituency and Tirunelveli parliamentary constituency. Nanguneri police station, part of Tamil Nadu Police maintain law and order in Thattankulam.

Taluk	Nanguneri
Revenue blocks	Nanguneri
Post office	Karankadu
Fire Station	Nanguneri
Police station	Nanguneri
Regional Transport Office (RTO)	Vallioor
District Passport Cell	Tirunelveli
Regional Passport office	Madurai

== Transport ==
Thattankulam is located 4 km away from Nanguneri on Nanguneri to Ovari State Highway 89. The National Highway 7 is 3 km away and can be reached through SH 89.

The Tamil Nadu State Transport Corporation operates daily services connecting Tirunelveli – Thisayanvilai. Private Transport Corporation also operates daily services connecting Tirunelveli - Thisayanvilai, and Thisayanvilai - Kalakkad. All Private buses have stop at Thattankkulam. Except Tirunelveli – Thisayanvilai End to End all other TNSTC buses stop at Thattankulam.

The nearest railway station is located at Nanguneri 4 km away. The nearest railway junctions are Tirunelveli railway junction located at a distance of 35 km (22 mi) and Nagercoil railway junction 50 km (31 mi) away.

The nearest airport which is the Tuticorin Airport (TCR), located at Vaagaikulam in Thoothukkudi District, 60 km (37 mi) east of Thattankulam. The nearest international airports are the Madurai Airport, located at a distance of 190 km (120 mi) and the Thiruvananthapuram International Airport(TRV) is about 125 km (78 mi) away.

== Religion ==
=== C.S.I Christ Church ===
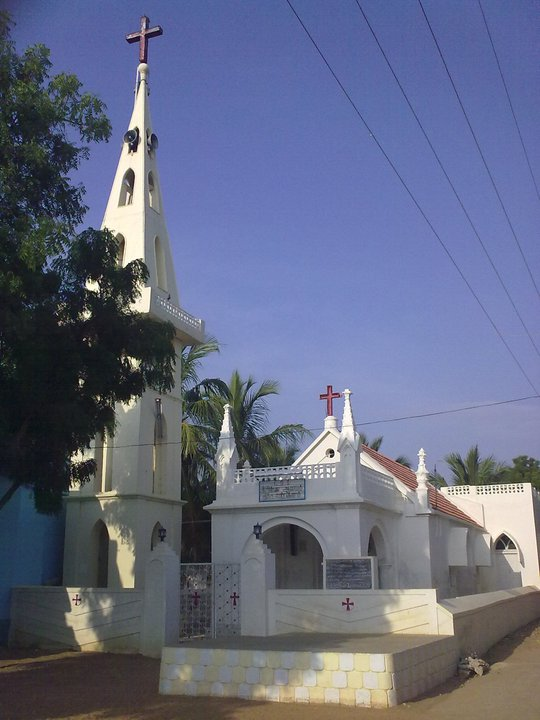
C.S.I Christ Church, Thattankulam

This church is a part of Tirunelveli Diocese. On a Sunday morning there is Service at 9:00 am. Holy Communion is on the first Sunday of evening month at 11:00 am. Evening service is at 7:00 pm on every week days.
