= Melagaram =

Melagaram Melakaram
- Town
- Location in Tamil Nadu, India
- Coordinates: 8°56′16″N 77°17′27″E
- Country: India
- State: Tamil Nadu
- District: Tenkasi
- Taluk: Tenkasi

Population (2011)
  - Total: 14,644

Languages
  - Official: Tamil
- Time zone: UTC+5:30 (IST)

Melagaram is a panchayat town in Tenkasi district,and residential suburb of Tenkasi city in the Indian state of Tamil Nadu. The Famous Composer Thirigudarasapa Kavirayar was born in Melagaram. Thirutrala Kuravanji is a classic Tamil language poem composed by Thirigudarasapa Kavirayar around 1600 - 1700 CE.

== Demographics ==
In 2001, Melagaram had a population of 12,860, according to the Indian census Males constituted 49% of the population and females 51%. Melagaram had an average literacy rate of 78%, higher than the national average of 59.5%: male literacy was 84%, and female literacy was 72%. In Melagaram, 9% of the population was under 6 years of age.

By the 2011 census, the town had grown to 14,644 inhabitants.

== Location ==
Melagaram located between Tenkasi and Coutrallam about 1 km away from Tenkasi.

Melagaram consists of Chinthamani, Bharathi Nagar, Melagaram, NGO Colony, State Bank Colony, Indira Nagar, Min Nagar, Nannagaram, Kudiyiruppu.

Bharathi Nagar, NGO Colony, State Bank Colony, Indira Nagar, Min Nagar are newly developed colonies in the last 25 to 30 years.

== Geography ==
- Chitha AR River
- Paarai Kulam (Behind Brahmin Street)

== Landmarks ==
Town Panchayat Office, Govt. Hr. Sec. School, Primary Health Center, Library

== Economy ==
The first regional rural bank of Tamil Nadu, the Pandyan Grama Bank, has one of its branches at Melagaram.

== Temples ==
•Shenbaga Vinayagar Temple •Muppudathi Amman Temple •Thangamman Temple •Shenbaga Devi Amman Temple •Vinayaka Temple (South Street) •Vinayaka Temple (Brahmin Street)
