= Alangulam block =

Revenue block in Tamil Nadu, India

Alangulam block is a revenue block in the Tenkasi district of Tamil Nadu, India. It has a total of 32 panchayat villages. It was in Tirunelveli district until the formation of Tenkasi district on 22 November 2019.
