= Pudur, Tirunelveli =

Pudur (S)
- town
- Location in Tamil Nadu, India
- Coordinates: 9°01′30″N 77°11′00″E
- Country: India
- State: Tamil Nadu
- District: Tenkasi

Population (2001)
  - Total: 11,095

Languages
  - Official: Tamil
- Time zone: UTC+5:30 (IST)

Pudur (S) is a panchayat town in Tenkasi district in the Indian state of Tamil Nadu.

== Demographics ==
As of 2001 India census, Pudur (S) had a population of 11,095. Males constitute 49% of the population and females 51%. Pudur (S) has an average literacy rate of 63%, higher than the national average of 59.5%: male literacy is 74%, and female literacy is 52%. In Pudur (S), 12% of the population is under 6 years of age.
