= Sengottai taluk =

Sengottai taluk is a taluk of Tenkasi district of the Indian state of Tamil Nadu. The headquarters is the town of Sengottai.

== Demographics ==
According to the 2011 census, the taluk of Sengottai had a population of 141,250 with 70,733 males and 70,517 females. There were 997 women for every 1000 men. The taluk had a literacy rate of 72.15. Child population in the age group below 6 was 7,146 Males and 6,731 Females.
