= Melaneelithanallur block =

Melaneelithanallur block is a revenue block in the Tenkasi district of Tamil Nadu, India. It has a total of 25 panchayat villages.
