= Aluthakanniar River =

Coordinates: 8.927682°N 77.324679°E

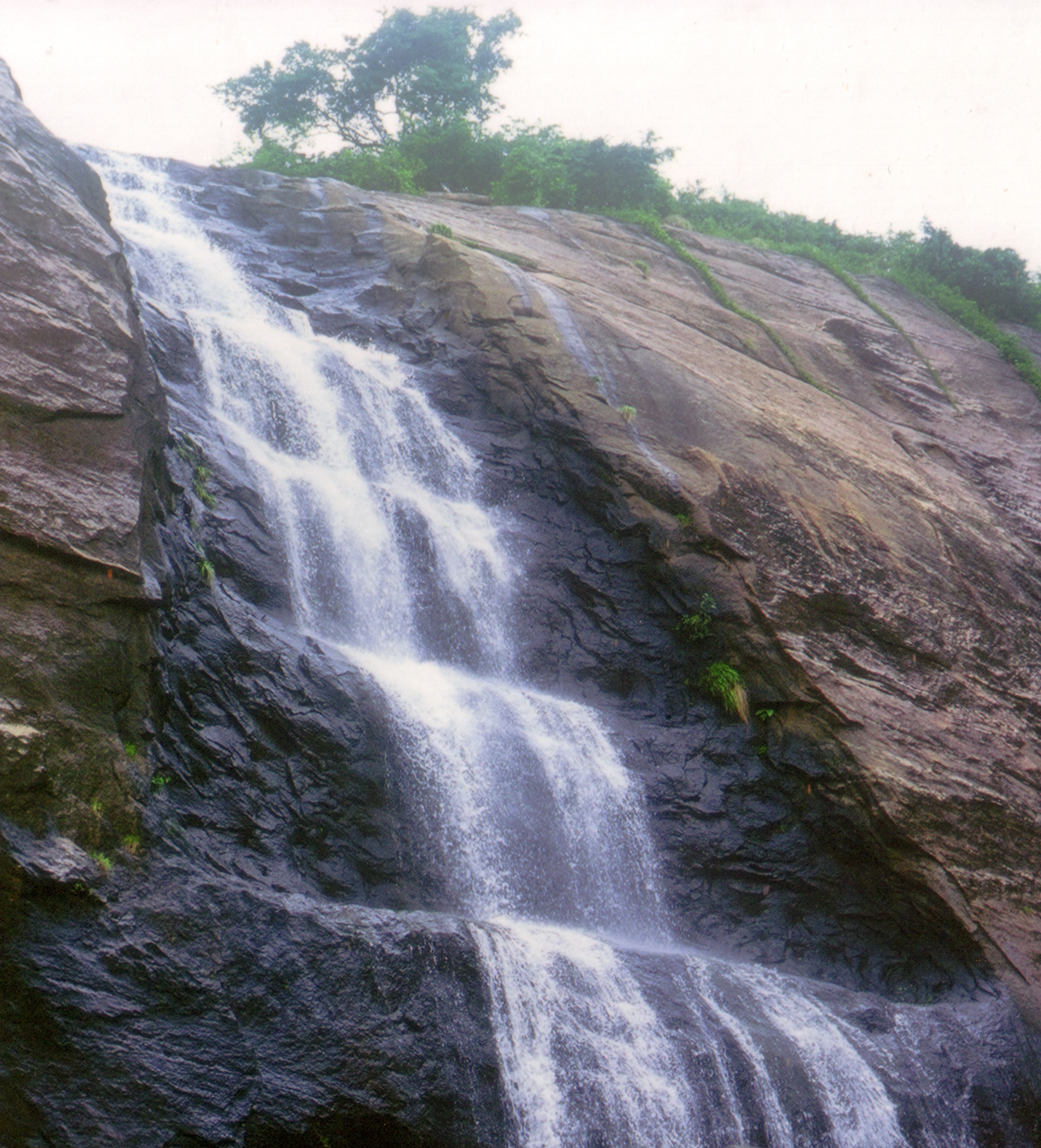
Courtallam Falls

Aluthakanniar is a river flowing in the Tirunelveli district of the Indian state of Tamil Nadu. It is one of the tributaries of Chittar River, which joins Tamiraparani near Tirunelveli. It arises in the eastern slopes of the Western Ghats, and forms the Old Kutralam falls as it descends down the mountain. It flows 10 kilometres (6 mi) towards northeast before joining its main river Chittar near Kadapagothi village.

== See also ==
List of rivers of Tamil Nadu
