= Aintharuviar River =

Coordinates: 8.931608°N 77.237907°E

Aintharuviar
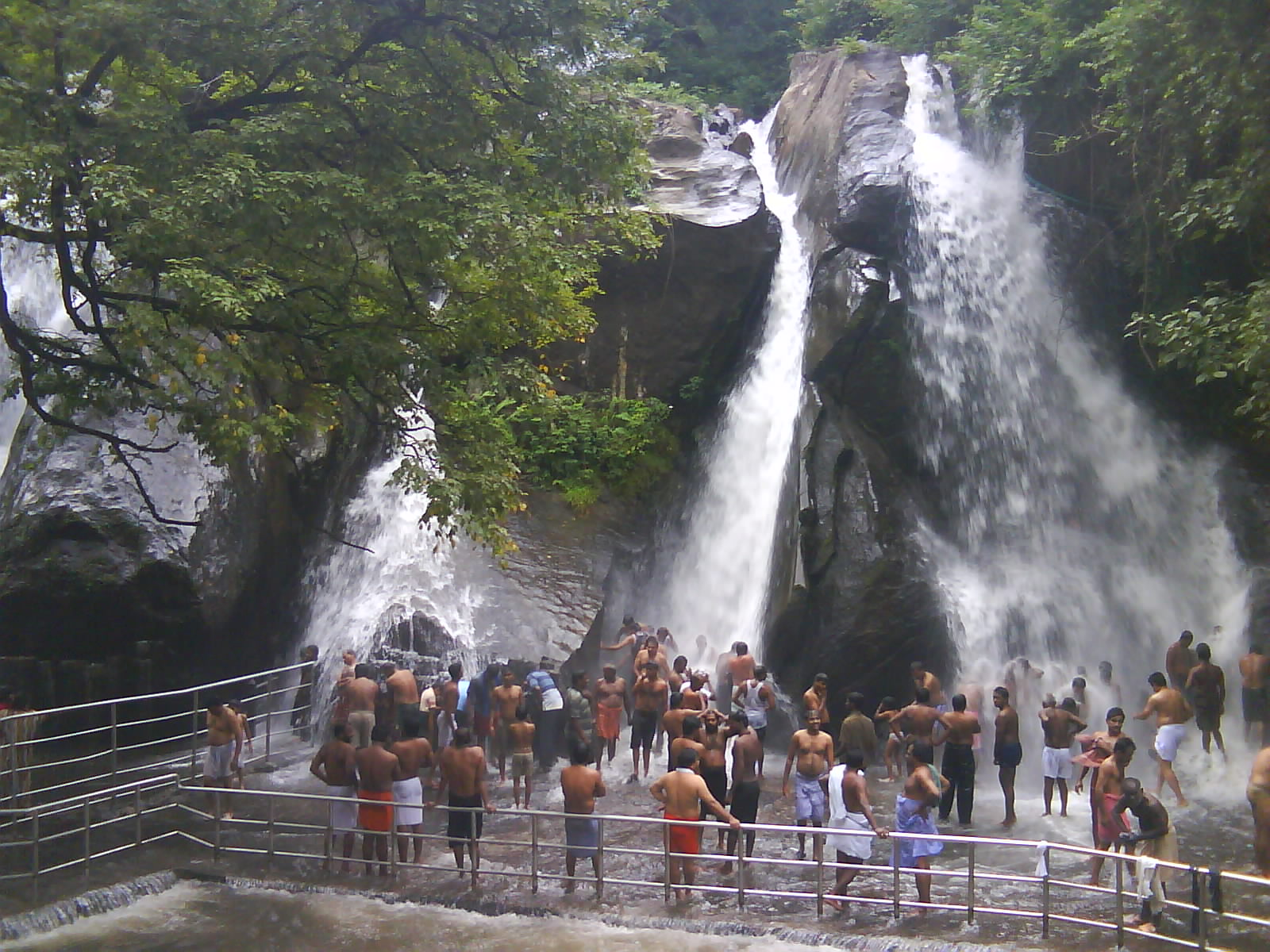

- Location within Tamil Nadu Location within India

The Aintharuviar River is a river flowing in the Tirunelveli district of the Indian state of Tamil Nadu. It is a tributary of the Chittar River, which itself is a major tributary of the Thamirabarani River. Its source is in the eastern slopes of the Eastern Ghats, and merges with the Chittar River near the Gajamajorpuram village. Through the Thamirabarani River, it eventually flows into the Gulf of Mannar.

It is named for the fact that it gives rise to a group of five waterfalls, which are themselves known as the Aintharuvi. The name is a portmanteau of the words ஐந்து (pronounced ainthu, meaning five) and அருவி (pronounced aruvi, meaning waterfall), thus being a literal meaning.

== See also ==
List of rivers of Tamil Nadu
