= Tenkasi taluk =

Tenkasi taluk is a taluk of Tenkasi district of the Indian state of Tamil Nadu. The headquarters is the town of Tenkasi. In addition to the headquarters town, the taluk includes the towns of Aygudi, Courtalam, Ilanji, Kadayanallur, Melagaram, Sambavar Vadagarai and Sundarapandiapuram as well as some twenty-five villages.

== Demographics ==
According to the 2011 census, the taluk of Tenkasi had a population of 399,823 with 199,317 males and 200,506 females. There were 1,006 women for every 1,000 men. The taluk had a literacy rate of 72.55%. Child population in the age group below 6 years were 20,277 Males and 19,621 Females.
