= Thiruvenkadam =

Coordinates: 9°15′25″N 77°40′20″E

Thiruvengadam
- Panchayat Town
- Interactive map of Thiruvengadam
- Country: India
- State: Tamil Nadu
- District: Tenkasi

Population (2011)
  - Total: 8,337

Languages
  - Official: Tamil
- Time zone: UTC+5:30 (IST)
- Postal code: 627719
- Website: http://www.townpanchayat.in/thiruvengadam

Thiruvengadam is a panchayat town Revenue Village in Thiruvengadam Taluk, Panchayat village in Kuruvikulam Block in Tenkasi district in the Indian state of Tamil Nadu.

Thiruvengadam Town Panchayat Located 60.00 km from Tenkasi headquarters of the district.

The nearest airport is Madurai International Airport (120.8km), and the nearest railway station is Sankarankovi, 18.00 km away. It is also on the bus routes from Kovipatti To Rajapalayam and Sankarankovil To Sivakasi.
