= Kadayam block =

Kadayam block is a revenue block in the Tenkasi district of Tamil Nadu, India. It has a total of 23 panchayat villages.
