= Avudaiyanoor =

Avudaiyanoor is a village in Tamil Nadu, India. It is located near Pavoorchatram town of Tenkasi taluk in Tirunelveli district. The population of the village is 15,587 as of the 2011 census. It is developing, and PMGSY (Pradhan Mantri Gram Sadak Yojna) is making new roads in the village.

== Geography ==
Theertharapuram is situated in the foothills of Western Ghats, between the cities of Tirunelveli and Tenkasi. The village is 15 km (9.3 mi) east of Tenkasi and 45 km (28 mi) west of Tirunelveli. These two cities also have the closest large railway stations.

== Education ==
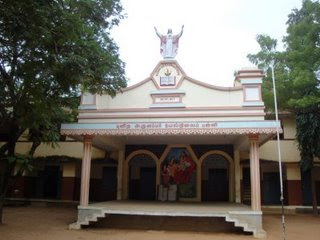
Church in the school campus.

Punitha Arulappar Higher Secondary School is located here.

== Demographics ==
The population consists of Hindus and Christians. Hindus are the majority of the population.
