= Keezhapavur =

- Town
- Location in Tamil Nadu, India
- Coordinates: 8°54′58″N 77°25′21″E
- Country: India
- State: Tamil Nadu
- District: Tenkasi

Government
  - Type: primary municipality
- Elevation: 158 m (518 ft)

Population (2001)
  - Total: 19,958

Languages
  - Official: Tamil
- Time zone: UTC+5:30 (IST)
- PIN: 627806
- Telephone code: 04633
- Sex ratio: 1000 :1040.8 ♂/♀
- Literacy: 69%
- Lok Sabha constituency: Tenkasi
- Vidhan Sabha constituency: Alangulam
- Website: www.keelapavoor.com

Keezhapavur or Keelapavoor is a town panchayat, in Tenkasi district in the Indian state of Tamil Nadu.

== Demographics ==
As of 2001 India census, Keezhapavur had a population of 19,958. Males constitute 50% of the population and females 50%. Keezhapavur has an average literacy rate of 67%, higher than the national average of 59.5%: male literacy is 76%, and female literacy is 57%. In Keezhapavur, 12% of the population is under 6 years of age.
