= Tenkasi division =

Tenkasi division is a revenue division in the Tenkasi district of Tamil Nadu, India.
