= Aladi Sankaraiya =

Indian politician

State secretary, Tamil Nadu Congress

Personal details
- Party: Indian National Congress
- Children: son : S.Anandaraj and daughters :2(two)

Aladi Sankaraiya is a politician from Alangulam.

== Personal life ==
He has two daughters and one son named S. Anandaraj.

== Political career ==
His political debut was from the periods of the late Kamaraj.

=== Electoral performance in Assembly elections ===
Year	Status	Constituency	Party	Votes	Runner-up/Winner	Party	Votes
1996	Runner	Tenkasi	INC	29,998	K. Ravi Arunan	TMC	60,758
