= Vasudevanallur block =

Vasudevanallur block is a revenue block in the Tenkasi district of Tamil Nadu, India. It has a total of 22 panchayat villages.
