= Dharshan =

Dharshan is both a given name and a surname. Notable people with the name include:

- Dharshan Kumaran (born 1975), English chess grandmaster
- Dharshan Munidasa (born 1970), Sri Lankan chef-restaurateur
- Dharshan Thavaraja (born 1994), Sri Lankan actor and artist
