= Chittar River =

River in Tamil Nadu

Coordinates: 8°51′N 77°49′E

Chittar Chitranathi
- Etymology: 'Little river' or 'Beautiful River'

Physical characteristics
- Source
  - location: Courtallam hills, Tamil Nadu
  - elevation: 1,750 m (5,740 ft)
- Length: 80 km (50 mi)

Basin features
- Waterfalls: Coutrallam Falls

Chittar River and its five tributaries and numerous other contributing streams originate in the Courtallam hills of Tenkasi district in the state of Tamil Nadu in southern India. Together with its tributaries and streams, the Chittar River serves as an important source of irrigation for the region and is a major tributary of the Tambaraparani River along with the Manimuthar River.

== Tributaries ==
The Chittar has several tributaries which include the Aintharuviar (joining near Gajamajorpuram), the Gundar which joins near Tenkasi, the Hanumanathi joining in Thayar Thoppu near Veerakeralampudur and the Aluthakanniar which merges in the village of Kadapagothi.

== Irrigation ==
The Chittar runs for about 80 kilometres (50 mi) before it meets with its first tributary which has an anicut and irrigates about 293 hectares (720 acres) of land. One of its next tributaries has a reservoir provided by an anicut, feeding about 142 hectares (350 acres). The next tributary has seven anicuts and a reservoir and irrigates about 465 hectares (1,150 acres) of land altogether. This pattern continues as each tributary and other contributing rivers has anicuts and reservoirs that provide irrigation for the adjacent land.

The Chittar River itself has 17 anicuts irrigating about 8,903 hectares (22,000 acres) of land. It eventually joins with Thamirabarani river.
