= Aygudi =

Ayikudi
- Town
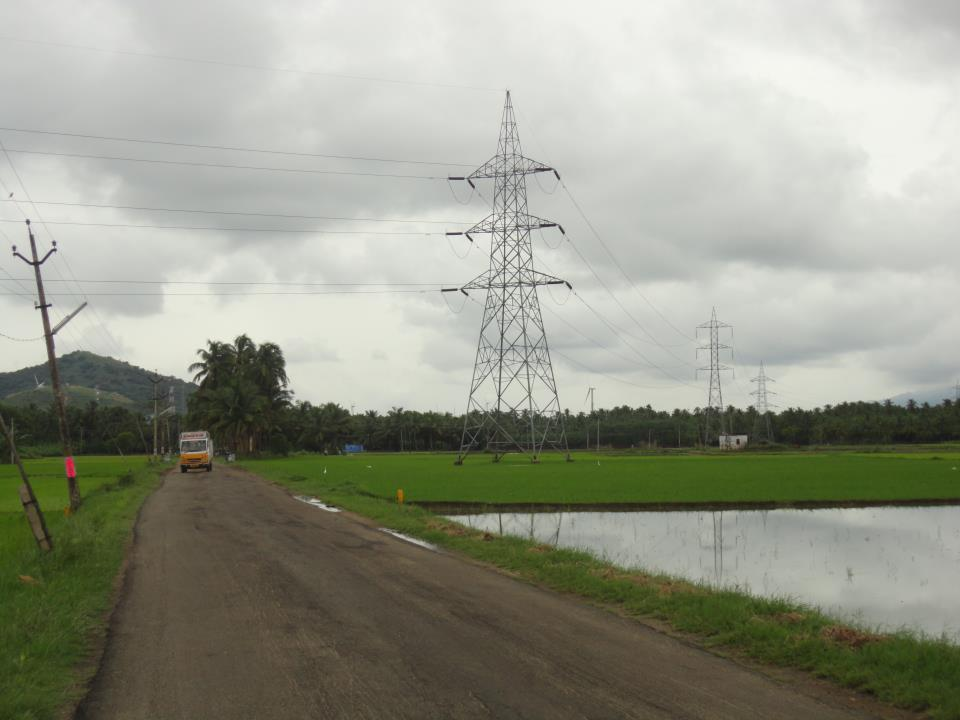
- Paddy fields around Aaikudi

- Location in Tamil Nadu, India
- Coordinates: 8°59′13″N 77°20′20″E
- Country: India
- State: Tamil Nadu
- District: Tenkasi
- Taluk: Kadayanallur

Population (2011)
  - Total: 15,172

Languages
  - Official: Tamil
- Time zone: UTC+5:30 (IST)
- Postal code: 627852

Aygudi, also spelled Aaikudi, is a panchayat town in Tenkasi district in the state of Tamil Nadu, India.

== History ==
Aai Andiran was the chieftain of Aaikudi and its surroundings. He is one of the seven great philanthropists of ancient Tamil Nadu. He gave an elephant to the commoners Tamil wikipedia

== Demographics ==
In the 2001 India census, Aaikudi had a population of 12,924. Males constituted 50% of the population and females 50%. Aaikudi had an average literacy rate of 64%, higher than the national average of 59.5%; with 56% of the males and 44% of females literate. 11% of the population was under 6 years of age.

By the 2011 census the population had increased to 15,172.

== Cityscape ==
=== Landmark ===
Ayikudi Balasubramanya Swami Temple (kaliyamman temple) is situated at the banks of Hanuman river. Skanda shasti soora samharam is the famous festival celebrated every year for 7 days.
