= Veerakeralamputhur taluk =

Settlement in Tamil Nadu, India

Coordinates: 8.936480°N 77.448950°E

Veerakeralamputhur taluk is a taluk of Tenkasi district of the Indian state of Tamil Nadu. The headquarters is in the town of Veerakeralampudur.
