= Alangulam taluk =

Coordinates: 8.866828°N 77.495735°E

Alangulam taluk is a taluk of Tenkasi district of the Indian state of Tamil Nadu. The headquarters is the town of Alangulam.

== Demographics ==
According to the 2011 census, the taluk of Alangulam had a population of 175,989 with 87,157 males and 88,832 females. There were 1,019 women for every 1,000 men. The taluk had a literacy rate of 70.93. Child population in the age group below 6 was 9,271 Males and 9,128 Females.
