= Kadayanallur taluk =

Kadayanallur taluk is a taluk in Tenkasi district in the Indian state of Tamil Nadu. It was created with Kadayanallur town as the headquarters due to the population increase and developmental issues.

There are 30 villages in the Kadayanallur taluk excluding Kadayanallur town itself.
