= Sivagiri taluk =

Sivagiri taluk is a taluk of tenkasi district of the Indian state of Tamil Nadu. The headquarters is the town of Sivagiri.

== Demographics ==
According to the 2011 census, the taluk of Sivagiri had a population of 193,979 with 95,421 males and 98,558 females. There were 1033 women for every 1000 men. The taluk had a literacy rate of 67.47. Child population in the age group below 6 was 9,058 Males and 8,842 Females.
