= Veerakeralampudur =

Veerakeralampudur V.K.Pudur, V.K.Puthur,
- Town
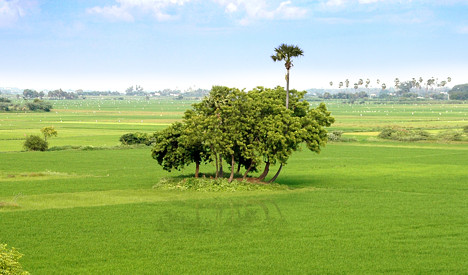
- Paddy Fields around Veerakeralampudur

- Location in Tamil Nadu, India
- Coordinates: 8.9364800°N 77.448950°E
- Country: India
- State: Tamil Nadu
- District: Tenkasi
- Talukas: Veerakeralampudur

Population
  - Total: 6,483

Languages
  - Official: Tamil
- Time zone: UTC+5:30 (IST)
- PIN: 627861
- Telephone code: 04633 - 277xxx
- Vehicle registration: TN72, TN76
- Nearest city: Tenkasi
- Sex ratio: 1089 ♂/♀
- Literacy: 765%
- Lok Sabha constituency: Tenkasi
- Vidhan Sabha constituency: Tenkasi

Veerakeralampudur is a small town in Tenkasi district in the Indian state of Tamil Nadu.

== Economy ==
=== Agriculture ===
Agriculture is the main occupation. Most of the people work in farm fields and rolling Beedi. The main crops are paddy, onion, tomato, brinjal, tamarind, green chili, red chili, coconut. It is also known for its vast paddy and coconut fields. Most of the last generation of residents were farmers; however, many are now employed in various parts of India and in foreign countries such as the United States, Singapore, Malaysia and the Persian Gulf.

== Geography and Climate ==
It has an average elevation of 101 meters above mean sea level. The climate is dry and hot, with Southwest monsoon rains during October–December. Temperatures during summer reach a maximum of 40 and a minimum of 26.3 °C, though temperatures over 43 °C are not uncommon. Winter temperatures range between 29.6 and 18 °C. The average annual rainfall is about 85 cm.

The town is surrounded by two rivers Chittar River and Hanumanathi. Both Hanumanathi and Chittar River merges rightly exactly in this village thus forming the major tributary to Thamirabarani River.

=== Revenue villages ===
The Revenue Villages which fall under Veerakeralampudur are:

- Achankundram
- Agaram
- Anaikulam
- Kalluthu
- Karuvantha
- Keelakalangal
- Kulaiyaneri
- Kurichampatti
- Marukkalankulam
- Melakalangal
- Melamaruthappapuram
- Muthammalpuram
- Navaneethakrishnapuram
- Palapathiraramapuram
- Rajagopalaperi
- Sivagurunathapuram
- Surandai
- Thayarthoppu
- Uthumalai
- Thuthikulam
- Vadakkukavalakurichi
- Vadi
- Veerakeralampudur
- Veeranam
- Vellakkal
- Zaminsurandai

== Demographics ==
Veerakeralampudur-Rural

Parameter	Total	Male	Female	Percentage	Sex Ratio
Population	6483	3211	3272	100	1019
Population (0-6)	704	323	381	12.18	1180
Scheduled Castes	202	102	100	3.5	980
Scheduled Tribes	0	0	0	0	0
Literates	4373	2538	1835	75.67	723
Illiterates	2110	673	1437	24.33	2135
Workers	3533	1831	1702	54.5	930
Main Workers	3416	1737	1679	52.69	967
Main Cultivators	522	435	87	15.28	200
Main Agricultural Labourer	778	588	190	22.78	756
Main Workers in Household Industries	1373	67	1306	40.19	19493
Main Other Workers	743	647	96	21.75	273
Marginal Workers	117	94	23	1.8	479
Marginal Cultivators	10	9	1	8.55	111
Marginal Agricultural labourers	87	71	16	74.36	225
Marginal Workers in Household industries	4	1	3	3.42	3000
Marginal Other Workers	16	13	3	13.68	231
Non Workers Households	2950	1380	1570	45.5	1138
Households			1675		

== Education ==
=== Schools ===
- Government Hr. sec School
- Anna Boys Hr. sec School
- St. Antony's girls Hr. sec School
- RC Primary School
- Government Primary School
- Anna Primary School

=== Colleges near Veerakeralampudur ===
- Government ITI - Veerakeralampudur
- Anna Teacher Training Institute, Veerakeralampudur
- Sardar Raja College of Engineering,(6 km from Veerakeralampudur)Tenkasi-Alangulam road, Athiuttru, Tamizhlur, Alangulam.
- Government College of Arts & Science (Surandai) (6 km from Veerakeralampudur)
- M.S.P.V.L. Polytechnic (10 km from Veerakeralampudur), Pavoorchatram
- Senthil Andaver Polytechnic (12 km from Veerakeralampudur), Ayikudi - Tenkasi
- Sattanathar Karaiyalar arts college Tenkasi
- J.P College of Engineering (12 km from Veerakeralampudur), Ayikudi - Tenkasi
- J.P Arts & Science College (12 km from Veerakeralampudur), Ayikudi - Tenkasi
