= Sivagiri, Tenkasi =

Sivagiri(சிவகிரி) sivagiri seemai
- Town
- Nickname: sivagiri seemai
- Location in Tamil Nadu, India
- Coordinates: 9.33°N 77.43°E
- Country: India
- State: Tamil Nadu
- District: Tenkasi
- Elevation: 165 m (541 ft)

Population (2001)
  - Total: 20,160

Languages
  - Official: Tamil
- Time zone: UTC+5:30 (IST)

Sivagiri is a panchayat town and a tourist place in Tenkasi district in the Indian state of Tamil Nadu. Sivagiri is located at a distance of 50 km north to Tenkasi, 20 km south to Rajapalayam, 95 km north-west to Tirunelveli, 95 km south to Madurai, 540 km south to Bangalore, 150 km north to Thiruvananthapuram and 580 km south to the state capital Chennai.

It was one of the Palayams in ancient Madurai. It is located in the leeward side of the Western Ghats. Many seasonal rivers originate from this Mountains. One of the rivers is Kombai river which is located in the Western Ghats, Sivagiri. Thalayanai waterfalls and Rasingaperi canal are also main tourist attractions located at the Western Ghats region in Sivagiri. Sastha Kovil waterfalls located at a distance of 6 km from Sivagiri in the reserved forest region of western ghats. Dharani Sugars is also operating in Dharani Nagar, Sivagiri. Many waterfalls, rivers flow from the Western Ghats across Sivagiri. Wild species such as elephants, leopards, wild boars, sloth bears, wild cats, and deer were found in this region.

== Location ==
This is one of the three Palayams and is located in the Sivagiri taluk of the Tenkasi district, on the slopes of the Western Ghats.

== Anglo wars ==
The polygar of Sivagiri bore a personal animosity to the Puli Thevar of Nerkkatumseval and refrained from joining the coalition he put together to fight the Anglo-Nawabi forces in 1754. In 1757, he joined forces with Yusuf Khan, the nawab military commander, against the Puli Thevar. When Kollamkondan again rebelled in 1764, following the execution of Yusuf Khan for having betrayed the nawab, Sivagiri was quick to join. Victories over the Anglo-Nawabi forces helped the revolt spread to other polygars.

== Notable events ==
- After 1766, General Donald Campbell began a systematic campaign, taking the forts of the major confederates one by one, including Sivagiri.
- The polygar of Sivagiri and the Nayak polygar of Panchalamkurichi led the opposition to the Nawab, and the stalemate continued until the outbreak of the Second Mysore War in 1780.
- Hyder Ali invaded the Carnatic, took Madura and restored the kingdom of Madura under a Nayak prince.
- Polygar Chinna Thambi Varaguna proclaimed his allegiance to the new Madura king and mobilized the Western Bloc of polygars. The desperate situation the Nawab found himself in forced him to entrust the collection of revenue to the company, whose armies then undertook to pacify the country.
- Varaguna put up a stiff resistance to Colonel William Follarton and was defeated (in 1783) only through the treason of the polygar of Chokkampatti (q.v.), who had an old score to settle with him. Sivagiri and Panchalamkurichi submitted to the British, paid tribute, and posted bonds for the restoration of their forts. At the end of the Third Mysore War, and following the withdrawal of the British forces from Tirunelveli, Polygar Chinna Thambi Varaguna again sought to reassert himself.
- He annexed neighboring palayams, including Nerkattumseval and Perayur. In 1792 he invaded Sethur, killed the polygar, and replaced him with a cousin, as if Sethur were his own dependency.
- The Company sent in an army and took him prisoner. He was forced to restore his conquests to their former ruler. He was allowed to retain his palayam only because the company did not wish to turn it over to the Nawab, who had asked for it.
- In 1797, the son of the ruling polygar rebelled against his father's government, probably with the support of Kattabomman of Panchalamkurichi.
- Prompt action by the Company quashed the revolt. During the First Polygar War, Sivagiri sided with the British and helped defeat and capture Kattabomman. At the end of the war (1799), the polygar of Sivagiri surrendered six forts and 1,000 armed men to Major J. Bannerman.

== Administrative area during the late 1800s ==
Sivagiri palayam comprised 103 villages, survived into the 19th century as a leading zamindari name sangili veerapandiya chinna thambiyar ruling the 103 villages. In 1879 it had an area of 122.38 sq. m. and a population of 49,531.

== Geography ==
Sivagiri is located at 9.33°N 77.43°E. It has an average elevation of 165 metres (541 feet). This was formerly a zamindari town.

== Demographics ==
As of 2001 India census by Census Commissioner of India, Sivagiri had a population of 20,160. Males constitute 49% of the population and females 51%. Sivagiri has an average literacy rate of 57%, lower than the national average of 59.5%: male literacy is 68%, and female literacy is 46%. In Sivagiri, 9% of the population is under 6 years of age. Majority thevar community and senaiyar.

== Sivagiri Taluk ==
Sivagiri today has become a Taluk in the Tenkasi District. Most of the old palayams are under this Taluk. It lies on the National Highway 208 to Tenkasi and is 16 km from Rajapalayam and is 36 km from Sankarankovil.
