= Sengottai =

Shenkottai Shencottah
- Town
- Shenkottai
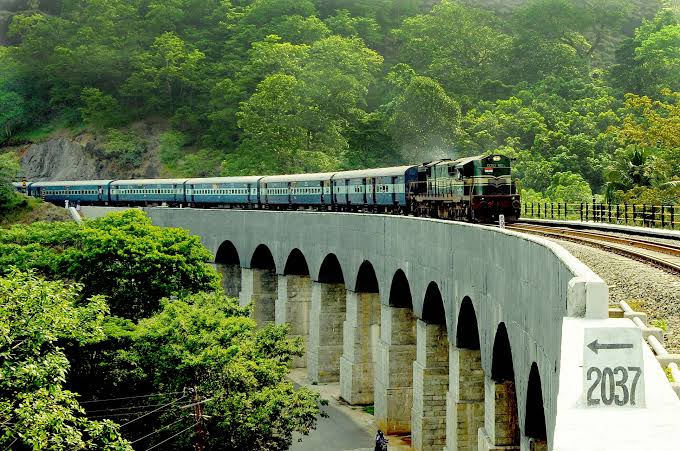
- 13 arch bridge in Kerala near Sengottai
- Nickname: Red Fort
- Location in Tamil Nadu, India
- Coordinates: 8°58′24″N 77°14′47″E
- Country: India
- State: Tamil Nadu
- District: Tenkasi
- Revenue Division: Tenkasi
- Taluk: Sengottai
- Named for: Red fort

Government
  - Type: Second Grade Municipality
  - Body: Shencottah Municipality

Area
  - Total: 2.68 km^{2} (1.03 sq mi)
- Elevation: 181 m (594 ft)

Population (2011)
  - Total: 26,823
  - Density: 10,000/km^{2} (25,900/sq mi)

Languages
  - Official: Tamil
  - Other Regional languages: Malayalam
- Time zone: UTC+5:30 (IST)
- PIN: 627809
- Telephone code: 04633
- Vehicle registration: TN-76
- Sex ratio: ♂/♀ 1035
- Website: www.municipality.tn.go.in/sengottai

Sengottai (also known as Shencottah, Chenkotta or Shenkottai) is a Town in the Tenkasi district, of Tamil Nadu, India.

== History ==
Sengottai was originally part of the Travancore Kingdom. In December 1851, the boundary between Tirunelveli and Travancore on the Sengottai side was clearly defined as proposed by General Cullen as early as 1846, and finally sanctioned by the Madras Government. Sengottai Municipality was constituted in 1921. In 1949, Sengottai was part of the newly formed state of Travancore-Cochin. The States Reorganisation Act, 1956 came into effect from 1 November 1956, and consequently, the Tamil-speaking area of Sengottai taluk of Quilon district were transferred from Travancore-Cochin to Tirunelveli district of Madras State. Sengottai was reclassified from a Grade III municipality to a Grade II municipality as per G.O. No.85 dated 22 May 1998.

== Demographics ==
Religious census
Religion	Percent(%)
Hindu	76.98%
Muslim	21.19%
Christian	1.77%
Other	0.06%

According to 2011 census, Sengottai had a population of 26,823 with a sex-ratio of 1,035 females for every 1,000 males, much above the national average of 929. A total of 2,642 were under the age of six, constituting 1,327 males and 1,315 females. Scheduled Castes and Scheduled Tribes accounted for 10.06% and 1.21% of the population respectively. The average literacy of the town was 78.09%, compared to the national average of 72.99%. The town had a total of 7146 households. There were a total of 10,736 workers, comprising 114 cultivators, 674 main agricultural labourers, 1,923 in household industries, 7,435 other workers, 590 marginal workers, 14 marginal cultivators, 60 marginal agricultural labourers, 105 marginal workers in household industries and 411 other marginal workers.

As per the religious census of 2011, Shenkottai had 76.98% Hindus, 21.19% Muslims, 1.77% Christians and 0.06% following other religions.

== Geography and climate ==
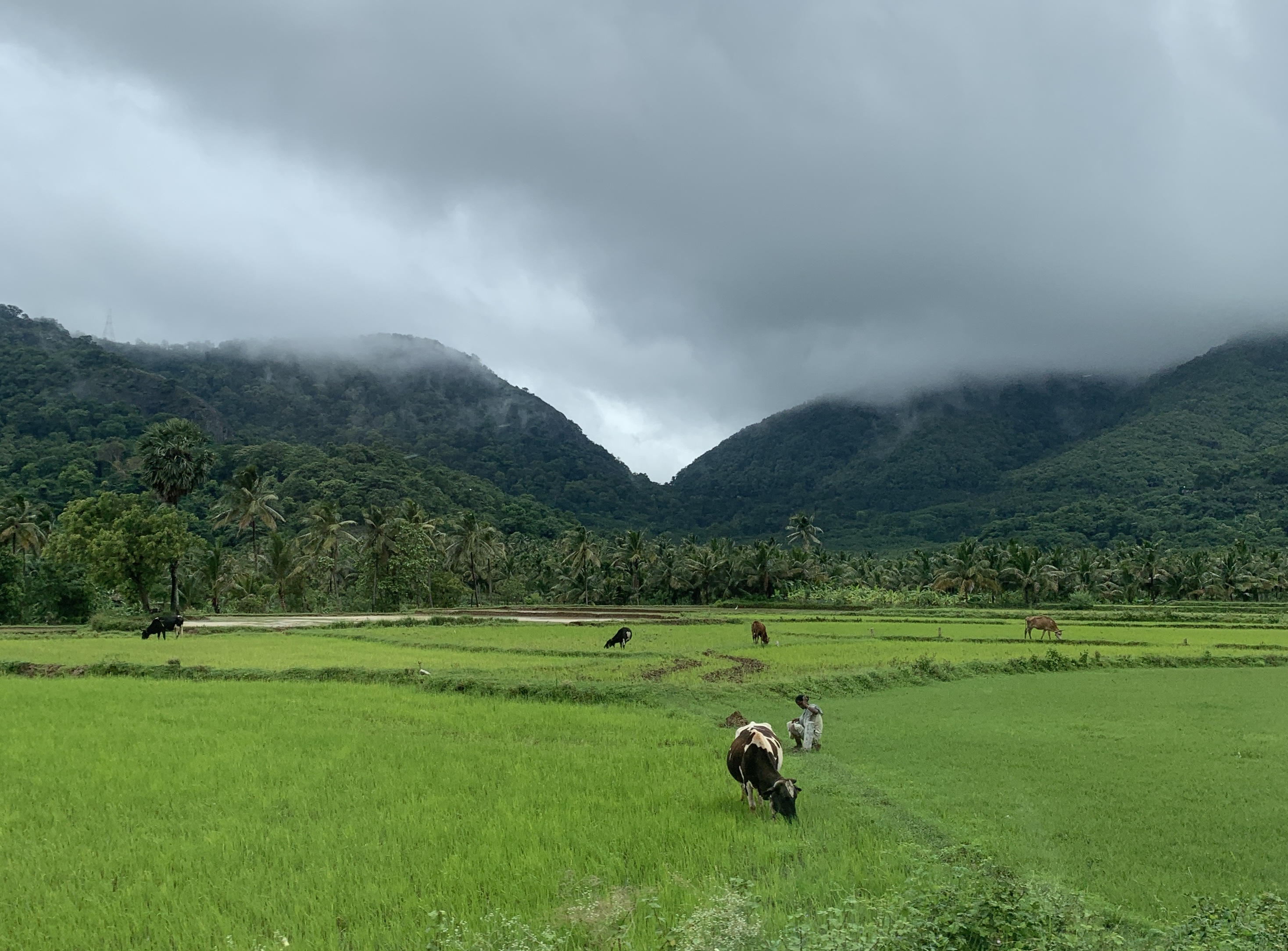
Monsoon view of the Sengottai Gap in the Western Ghats

Sengottai is located at 8.59°N 77.14°E. It has an average elevation of 181 metres (594 ft). The town is surrounded by the Western Ghats in three sides and lies on the Tirunelveli to Kollam and Madurai to Kollam highways. The Harihara and Gundar rivers flows through the city. Sengottai Gap is a major mountain pass connecting Kerala and Tamil Nadu in addition to Palakkad Gap.

Climate data for Sengottai, Tamil Nadu
Month	Jan	Feb	Mar	Apr	May	Jun	Jul	Aug	Sep	Oct	Nov	Dec	Year
Mean daily maximum °C (°F)	29.7 (85.5)	31.1 (88.0)	32.7 (90.9)	33.0 (91.4)	33.1 (91.6)	31.5 (88.7)	30.6 (87.1)	30.9 (87.6)	31.3 (88.3)	30.5 (86.9)	29.2 (84.6)	29.1 (84.4)	31.1 (87.9)
Mean daily minimum °C (°F)	21.6 (70.9)	22.2 (72.0)	23.6 (74.5)	24.8 (76.6)	25.3 (77.5)	24.5 (76.1)	24.0 (75.2)	24.0 (75.2)	23.9 (75.0)	23.5 (74.3)	22.8 (73.0)	21.8 (71.2)	23.5 (74.3)
Average precipitation mm (inches)	43 (1.7)	37 (1.5)	68 (2.7)	106 (4.2)	92 (3.6)	150 (5.9)	134 (5.3)	66 (2.6)	73 (2.9)	226 (8.9)	219 (8.6)	98 (3.9)	1,312 (51.8)
Source: Climate-Data.org

== Notable people ==
- Nigar Shaji - ISRO Scientist and Project director of Aditya-L1
- Vanchinathan- Indian freedom fighter and revolutionary.
