= Tenkasi district =

- District
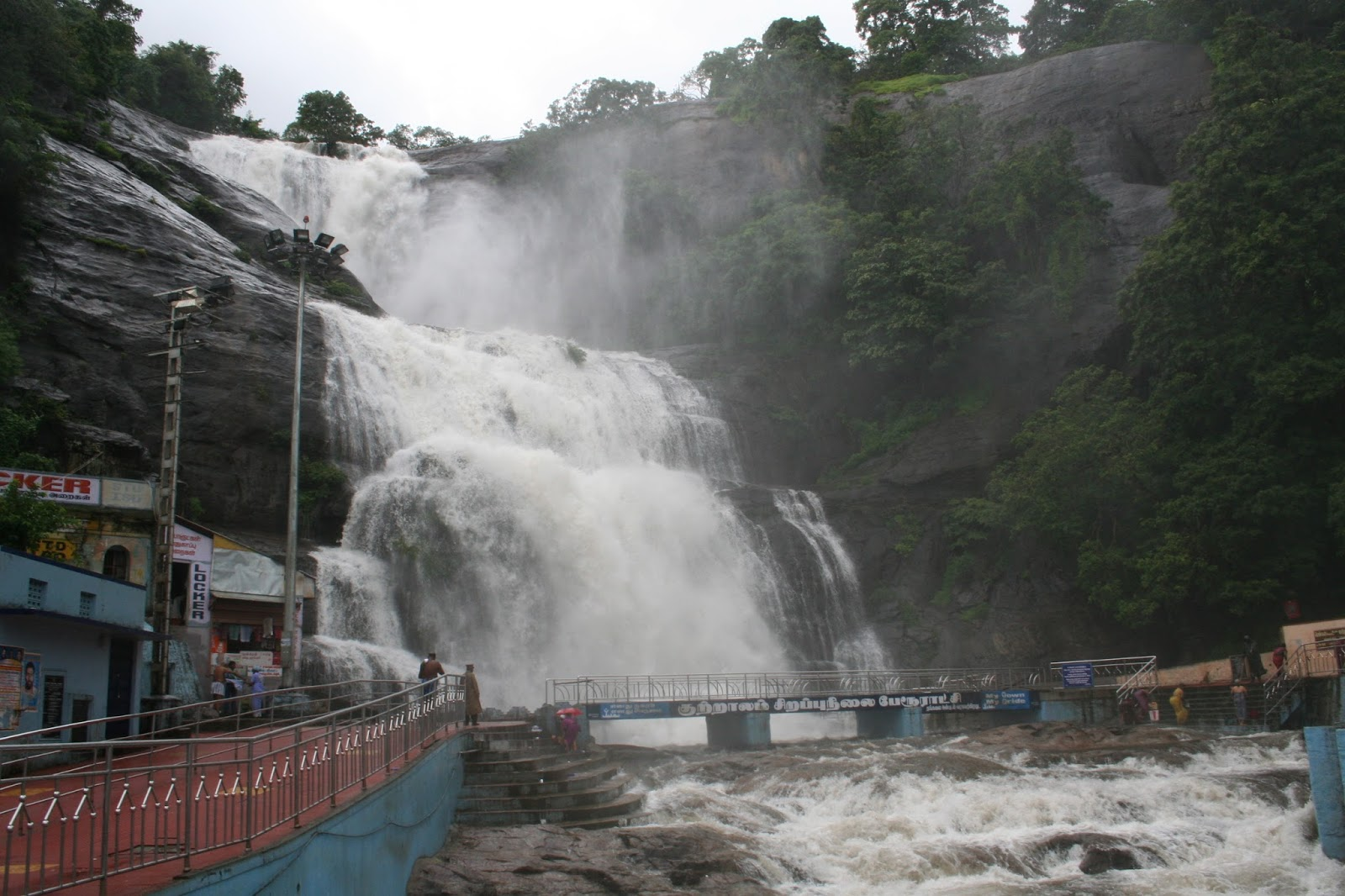
- Courtallam Falls
- Tenkasi district Location in Tamil Nadu
- Country: India
- State: Tamil Nadu
- Largest City: Tenkasi City
- Municipality: Tenkasi
- Established: 22 November 2019
- Founded by: Edappadi K. Palaniswami
- Seat: Tenkasi
- Talukas: Kadayanallur; Tenkasi; Sankarankovil; Shenkottai; Sivagiri; Veerakeralamputhur; Alangulam; Tiruvengadam

Government
  - Type: District Administration
  - Body: Tenkasi District Collectorate
  - Collector: Ranjeet Singh, I.A.S.
  - Superintendent of Police: E. T. Samson, I.P.S.

Area
  - Total: 2,802.93 km^{2} (1,082.22 sq mi)

Population
  - Total: 1,420,064
  - Density: 506.636/km^{2} (1,312.18/sq mi)

Languages
  - Official: Tamil
- Time zone: UTC+5:30 (IST)
- Vehicle registration: TN76 (Thenkasi region), TN79 (Sankarankoil region)
- Website: tenkasi.nic.in

Tenkasi district (Tamil: [t̪eŋɡaːsi]) is one of the 38 districts of Tamil Nadu, India, separated from Tirunelveli district on 22 November 2019. The Government of Tamil Nadu announced its creation on 18 July 2019. The district headquarters is at Tenkasi.

== Geography ==
The district shares borders with Tirunelveli district in the south, Virudhunagar district in the north, Thoothukudi district in the east and Kollam and Pathanamthitta districts of Kerala in the west. The western part of the district runs along the Western Ghats, while the east is mainly flat plains.

Tenkasi was formed from 8 talukas: Sivagiri, Sankarankovil, Veerakeralamputhur, Alangulam, Tenkasi and Shenkottai, Kadayanallur, Thiruvenkatam.

== Administration ==
=== Revenue Divisions and Taluks ===
Tenkasi Revenue Division: Shenkottai, Tenkasi, Kadayanallur, Veerakeralamputhur, Alangulam

Sankarankoil Revenue Division: Sankarankoil, Tiruvengadam, Sivagiri

=== Proposed Municipal Corporation ===
1. Tenkasi

=== Municipalities ===
1. Shenkottai
2. Kadayanallur
3. Puliyankudi
4. Surandai
5. Sankarankovil

=== Town Panchayats ===
1. Alangulam
2. Achampudur
3. Alwarkurichi
4. Aygudi
5. Courtallam
6. Ilanji
7. Keelapavoor
8. Melagaram
9. Panpoli
10. Pudur(s)
11. Rayagiri
12. Sambavar Vadagarai
13. Sivagiri
14. Sundarapandiapuram
15. Thiruvenkadam
16. Vadakarai Keezhpadugai
17. Vasudevanallur

=== Proposed Municipalities ===
1. Alangulam
2. Keelapavoor
3. Vasudevanallur
4. Sivagiri
5. Thiruvenkadam

=== Proposed Town Panchayats ===
1. Veerakeralampudur
2. Kadayam
3. Melaneelithanallur
4. Kuruvikulam

=== Panchayat Unions / Blocks ===
1. Shenkottai
2. Tenkasi
3. Kadayanallur
4. Vasudevanallur
5. Sankarankoil
6. Kuruvikulam
7. Melaneelithanallur
8. Keelapavoor
9. Alangulam
10. kasidharmam
11. Kadayam

== Politics ==
Tenkasi Assembly constituency is part of Tenkasi Lok Sabha constituency. The seat is reserved for scheduled castes.

=== Parliamentary Constituency ===
| No. | Assembly | Constituency | Reserved for (SC/ST/None) |
|---|---|---|---|
| 1 | Lok Sabha | Tenkasi | SC |

=== Assembly constituencies ===
| District | No. | Constituency | Name | Party | Alliance | Remarks |
|---|---|---|---|---|---|---|
| Tenkasi | 219 | Sankarankovil (SC) | Dr. Dhilipan Jaishankar | AIADMK | AIADMK+ | Supported TVK; Later declared support for EPS |
| Tenkasi | 220 | Vasudevanallur (SC) | E. Raja | DMK | SPA | |
| Tenkasi | 221 | Kadayanallur | T. M. Rajendran | DMK | SPA | |
| Tenkasi | 222 | Tenkasi | Kalai Kathiravan | DMK | SPA | |
| Tenkasi | 223 | Alangulam | P. H. Manoj Pandian | DMK | SPA | |

== Demographics ==
Religions in Tenkasi district (2011)
| Religion | Percent |
| Hinduism | 83.34% |
| Islam | 9.96% |
| Christianity | 6.56% |
| Other or not stated | 0.14% |
Distribution of religions

At the time of the 2011 census, Tenkasi district had a population of 1,420,064. Tenkasi district has 697,635 males and 743,160 females with a sex ratio of 1065 females per 1000 males. Scheduled Castes and Scheduled Tribes made up 292,900 (20.33%) and 3,656 (0.25%) of the population respectively. 613,758 (42.60%) of the population lived in urban areas.

Languages of Tenkasi district (2011)
1. Tamil (98.8%)
2. Telugu (0.92%)
3. Others (0.31%)

At the time of the 2011 census, 98.77% of the population spoke Tamil and 0.92% Telugu as their first language.

== Villages ==
- Anaikutiyur
- Avudaiyanoor
- Kodikurichi
- Subramaniapuram
- Thattankulam

== See also ==
- List of districts of Tamil Nadu
