= 1956 Birthday Honours =

Appointments given by Queen Elizabeth II in 1956

The Queen's Birthday Honours 1956 were appointments in many of the Commonwealth realms of Queen Elizabeth II to various orders and honours to reward and highlight good works by citizens of those countries. The appointments were made to celebrate the official birthday of The Queen.

They were published for the United Kingdom and Colonies, Australia, and New Zealand on 25 May 1956.

The recipients of honours are displayed here as they were styled before their new honour, and arranged by honour, with classes (Knight, Knight Grand Cross, etc.) and then divisions (Military, Civil, etc.) as appropriate.

== UK and Colonies ==
=== Viscount ===
- The Right Honourable Frederick Alexander, Baron Cherwell, CH. Lately Professor of Experimental Philosophy, Oxford. Paymaster General, 1942-1945 and 1951–1953. For public services.

=== Baron ===
- Sir Henry Cohen, MD, FRCP, JP. For services to Medicine.
- Lieutenant-General Sir Ronald Morce Weeks, KCB, CBE, DSO, MC, TD, Chairman, Vickers Ltd. Chairman, National Advisory Council for Education in Industry and Commerce; President, British Scientific Instrument Research Association.

=== Privy Counsellor ===
- Arthur Hugh Elsdale Molson, MP, Member of Parliament for Doncaster, 1931–1935, and for the High Peak Division since 1939; Parliamentary Secretary, Ministry of Works, 1951–1953; Joint Parliamentary Secretary, Ministry of Transport & Civil Aviation since 1953.

=== Baronet ===
- Alderman Cuthbert Lowell Ackroyd, Lord Mayor of London.
- Major William John Anstruther-Gray, MC, DL, MP, Member of Parliament for North Lanarkshire, 1931–1945, and for Berwick & East Lothian since 1951. Assistant Postmaster-General, May–July, 1945. For political and public services.
- Lieutenant-Colonel Sir Thomas Cecil Russell Moore, CBE, MP, Member of Parliament for Ayr Burgh, 1925-1950 and for the Ayr Division since 1950. For political and public services.
- Henry Gray Studholme, CVO, MP, Member of Parliament for Tavistock since 1942. A Conservative Whip, 1945–1951; Vice-Chamberlain of HM Household and a Government Whip, 1951–1956.

=== Knight Bachelor ===
- Austin Innes Anderson. For services to the British Shipping Industry.
- William Francis Beale, OBE, Chairman, Board of Management, Navy, Army and Air Force Institutes.
- Brigadier Edward Henry Lionel Beddington, CMG, DSO, MC, DL, Chairman of the Hertfordshire County Council.
- Samuel Phillips Bedson, MD, FRCP. Professor Emeritus of Bacteriology, University of London.
- Basil Henry Blackwell, JP, Bookseller and Publisher.
- John Burgoyne, OBE, JP. For political and public services in Luton.
- Harry George Champion, CIE, Professor of Forestry, University of Oxford.
- Douglas Clarke, JP. For political and public services in Stockport.
- Horace William Clarke, Chairman of the Aluminium Industry Council.
- William Menzies Coldstream, CBE, Painter, and Slade Professor of Fine Art, University of London.
- Cecil Brooksby Crabbe, Chief Registrar of Friendly Societies and Industrial Assurance Commissioner.
- George Herbert Dowty, Chairman, Cheltenham & North Gloucestershire Disablement Advisory Committee.
- Geoffrey Upcott Farrant, CBE. For political and public services in Somerset.
- Horace Stephen Gibson, CBE, Managing Director, Iraq Petroleum Company Ltd. and Associated Companies.
- Frederic Collins Hooper. For services to Government Departments.
- Leonard Hutton. For services to Cricket.
- James McKinnon, Chief Inspector, Board of Customs & Excise.
- Arthur Massey, CBE, MD, Chief Medical Officer, Ministry of Pensions and National Insurance.
- Walter Charles Norton, MBE, MC, President of The Law Society.
- Frederic James Osborn, Chairman of the Executive Committee, Town and Country Planning Association.
- Thomas Peacock, CBE, JP, Chairman, Milk Marketing Board.
- Professor William John Pugh, OBE, Director, Geological Survey of Great Britain and Museum of Practical Geology, Department of Scientific and Industrial Research.
- Allan Stephen Quartermaine, CBE, MC. For services to civil engineering. President, Institution of Civil Engineers, 1951–1952.
- James Jackson Robertson, OBE, JP, Rector, Aberdeen Grammar School.
- Alderman Stanley Graham Rowlandson, MBE, JP. For political and public services in Middlesex.
- Brigadier Alick Drummond Buchanan-Smith, CBE, TD, JP, DL. For political and public services in Scotland.
- Alexander Mainwaring Spearman, MP, Member of Parliament for Scarborough & Whitby since 1941. For political and public services.
- Gerard Spencer Summers, MP, Member of Parliament for Northampton, 1940–45 and for Aylesbury since 1950. Secretary, Department of Overseas Trade, May–July 1945. For political and public services.
- James William Tudor Thomas, MD, FRCS, Ophthalmic Surgeon, United Cardiff Hospitals.
- Thomas Williamson, CBE, JP, General Secretary, National Union of General and Municipal Workers.
- Maurice Gordon Willmott, MC, Chief Chancery Master, High Court of Justice.
- John Frederick Wolfenden, CBE, Vice-Chancellor, University of Reading.

State of Victoria

- Norman Myer. For political and philanthropic services in the State of Victoria.
- The Honourable Arthur George Warner, Minister of Transport, State of Victoria.

Commonwealth services

- George Alexander Strachan Sim, President of the Bengal Chamber of Commerce & Industry, and the Associated Chambers of Commerce of India, 1955–56.

Oversea territories

- Thomas Algernon Brown, Chief Justice, Northern Region, Nigeria.
- Chau Tsun-nin, CBE. For public services in Hong Kong.
- Colonel Ralf Billing Emerson, CIE, OBE, Chairman, Nigerian Railway Corporation.
- Joseph Welsh Park Harkness, CMG, OBE, MB, ChB, Medical Adviser to the Comptroller for Development and Welfare in the West Indies.
- Guy Wilmot McLintock Henderson, QC, Chief Justice, Bahamas.
- Commander (S) Robert Gillman Allen Jackson, CMG, OBE, Chairman, Preparatory Commission, Volta River Project, Gold Coast.
- Thomas Spurgeon Page, CBE. For public services in Northern Rhodesia.
- Ronald Lindsay Prain, OBE. For public services, in Northern Rhodesia.
- Ronald Ormiston Sinclair, Vice President, East African Court of Appeal.

=== Order of the Bath ===
==== Knight Grand Cross of the Order of the Bath (GCB) ====
Military Division

- Admiral Sir Guy Grantham, KCB, CBE, DSO.
- General Sir Eric Carden Robert Mansergh, KCB, KBE, MC (18612), late Royal Regiment of Artillery; Colonel Commandant, Royal Regiment of Artillery.

Civil Division

- Sir Ivone Augustine Kirkpatrick, GCMG, KCB, Permanent Under-Secretary of State, Foreign Office.

==== Knight Commander of the Order of the Bath (KCB) ====
Military Division

Royal Navy

- Vice-Admiral Eric George Anderson Clifford, CB, CBE.
- Vice-Admiral Caspar John, CB.

Army

- Lieutenant-General Gerald William Lathbury, CB, DSO, MBE (34834), late Infantry.
- Lieutenant-General William Pasfield Oliver, CB, OBE (18260), late Infantry; Colonel, The Queen's Own Royal West Kent Regiment.

Royal Air Force

- Air Marshal Richard Bowen Jordan, CB, DFC.
- Air Marshal Theodore Neuman McEvoy, CB, CBE.

Civil Division

- Edward Francis Muir, CB, Permanent Secretary, Ministry of Works.
- Sir (William) Gordon Radley, CBE, Director-General, General Post Office.

==== Companion of the Order of the Bath (CB) ====
Military Division

Royal Navy

- Rear-Admiral Richard Allix Braine.
- Rear-Admiral Patrick Willet Brock, DSO.
- Rear-Admiral Benjamin Bryant, DSO, DSC.
- Rear-Admiral John Dent, OBE.
- Rear-Admiral William Kaye Edden, OBE.
- Rear-Admiral Henry John Bedford Grylls.
- Surgeon Rear-Admiral (D) Leslie Bartlet Osborne, FDS, RCS(Ed.)
- Rear-Admiral Geoffrey Thistleton-Smith, GM.
- Rear-Admiral Robert Dymock Watson, CBE.
- Rear-Admiral William Kenneth Weston, OBE.

Army

- Major-General George Alexander Bond, CBE (37433), late Royal Army Service Corps.
- Brigadier Arthur Evers Brocklehurst, DSO (34654), late Royal Regiment of Artillery.
- Major-General George Oswald Crawford, CBE (12462), Royal Army Ordnance Corps.
- Major-General Wilfred George Fryer, CBE (6549), late Corps of Royal Engineers.
- Major-General Charles Ernest Rickards Hirsch, CBE (27204), late Infantry.
- Major-General Albert Edward Morrison, OBE (17226), late Royal Corps of Signals.
- Major-General William Gregory Huddleston Pike, CBE, DSO (31590), late Royal Regiment of Artillery.
- Colonel (acting) (Honorary Brigadier) George Rowland Patrick Roupell, VC, DL, Colonel, The East Surrey Regiment, South East Surrey Home Guard.
- Major-General Thomas Patrick David Scott, CBE, DSO (30926), late Infantry.
- Major-General Nigel Prior Hanson Tapp, CBE, DSO (30558), late Royal Regiment of Artillery.

Royal Air Force

- Air Vice-Marshal Reginald Horace Stanbridge, OBE, MRCS, LRCP, (Retd.)
- Air Vice-Marshal John Noel Tracy Stephenson, CBE.
- Acting Air Vice-Marshal Frederick George Stewart Mitchell, CBE.
- Air Commodore Henry Eeles, CBE.
- Air Commodore John Grandy, DSO.
- Air Commodore Douglas William Robert Ryley, CBE.
- Acting Air Commodore Patrick Hunter Dunn, CBE, DFC, ADC.
- Group Captain James Douglas Melvin, OBE.

Civil Division

- Louis Arnold Abraham, CBE, Principal Clerk of Committees, House of Commons.
- John Anderson, CBE, Chief Scientist, Admiralty Signal & Radar Establishment, Portsdown, Cosham, Hampshire.
- William Forbes Arbuckle, Under-Secretary, Scottish Education Department.
- William Lethbridge Gorell Barnes, CMG, Assistant Under-Secretary of State, Colonial Office.
- Leonard Henry Curzon, Under-Secretary, Ministry of Supply.
- Arthur Edward Miles Davies, Under-Secretary, Ministry of Education.
- Harold Sidney Gilham, Assistant Comptroller, Patent Office, Board of Trade.
- Gordon Grant, Under-Secretary, Board of Trade.
- Colonel Alfred Halkyard, MC, TD, DL, Chairman, Counties of Leicester and Rutland Territorial and Auxiliary Forces Association.
- Ronald Montague Joseph Harris, MVO, Permanent Commissioner of Crown Lands; lately Under-Secretary, Cabinet Office.
- Jonathan Edgar Keel, Under-Secretary, Ministry of Transport & Civil Aviation. United Kingdom representative on the Council of the International Civil Aviation Organization.
- Joseph Irvine Macgowan, lately Permanent Secretary, Ministry of Agriculture, Northern Ireland.
- Albert Edward Hefford Masters, CBE, Director, Fighting Vehicles Research & Development Establishment, Ministry of Supply.
- Albert Gordon Newman, CBE, Principal Assistant Solicitor, Office of HM Procurator General & Treasury Solicitor.
- Reginald Owen Mercer Nicholas, Secretary, Board of Inland Revenue.
- Group Captain Marcus Robinson, AFC, DL, Chairman, County of the City of Glasgow Territorial and Auxiliary Forces Association.
- Eric Roll, CMG, Under-Secretary, Ministry of Agriculture, Fisheries & Food.
- Peter Humphrey St. John Wilson, CBE, Under-Secretary, Ministry of Labour & National Service.

=== Order of Merit ===
- The Right Honourable William Malcolm, Baron Hailey, GCSI, GCMG, GCIE.

=== Order of Saint Michael and Saint George ===
==== Knight Grand Cross of the Order of St Michael and St George (GCMG) ====
- Sir Charles Brinsley Pemberton Peake, KCMG, MC, Her Majesty's Ambassador Extraordinary and Plenipotentiary in Athens.

==== Knight Commander of the Order of St Michael and St George (KCMG) ====
- Air Commodore James Alfred Easton, GB, CBE, RAF (Retd.) For Official services.
- Denis Hubert Fletcher Rickett CB, CMG, Third Secretary, HM Treasury.
- Henry Steven Potter, CMG, British Resident at Zanzibar.
- Charles Beresford Duke, CMG, CIE, OBE, Her Majesty's Ambassador Extraordinary and Plenipotentiary in Amman.
- Hugh Southern Stephenson, CMG, CIE, OBE, Her Majesty's Ambassador Extraordinary and Plenipotentiary in Saigon.
- John Guthrie Ward, CMG, Deputy Under-Secretary of State, Foreign Office.

Honorary Knight Commander

- Raja Syed Putra ibni Almarhum Syed Hassan Jamalullail, CMG, His Highness the Raja of Perlis, Federation of Malaya.

==== Companion of the Order of St Michael and St George (CMG) ====
- Donald Harrison Black, Chief Scientific Officer, Ministry of Supply.
- Charles Hubert Sebastian De Peyer, Under-Secretary, Ministry of Fuel and Power. Minister in the United Kingdom Delegation to the High Authority of the European Coal and Steel Community.
- Harold James Gray, Senior Trade Commissioner, Canberra, Board of Trade.
- Cyril Edward Lucas, Director of Marine and Freshwater Fishery Research, Scottish Home Department.
- Leslie Robert Missen, MC, Chief Education Officer, East Suffolk County Council Member of the Colonial Office Advisory Committee on Education in the Colonies.
- Richard Orme Wilberforce, OBE, QC, Senior Legal Adviser, British Delegation to the International Civil Aviation Organization.
- Heinerich Carl Meyer, ISO, MM, Commissioner and General Manager of the Harbours Board, State of South Australia.
- Colonel Richard William Spraggett, CVO, CBE, MC, Royal Marines (retired), Private Secretary and Comptroller to the Governor of the State of Victoria since 1949.
- Kenneth William Starr, OBE, ED, MS, Melb, FRCS, Councillor and Member of the Court of Examiners, Royal Australian College of Surgeons. For services to the Medical profession.
- Leonard Edward Bishop Stretton, a Judge of County Courts, and Chairman of Courts of General Sessions, State of Victoria.
- Martin Osterfield Wray, OBE, Resident Commissioner of the Bechuanaland Protectorate.
- Arthur William Abbott, CBE, Secretary to the Crown Agents for Oversea Governments and Administrations.
- Theodore Farnworth Anderson, OBE, MB, BCh, Director of Medical Services, Kenya.
- Julian Darrell Bates, CVO, Colonial Secretary, Gibraltar.
- Robert Porter Bingham, Resident Commissioner, Penang, Federation of Malaya.
- Richard Charles Catling, OBE, Commissioner of Police, Kenya.
- Alan Geoffrey Tunstal Chaplin, Colonial Secretary, Bermuda.
- Joseph William Deegan, CVO, lately Commissioner of Police, Uganda, now Deputy Inspector-General of Colonial Police.
- Orlando Peter Gunning, Senior Resident, Eastern Region, Nigeria.
- John Drew Higham, Director of Personnel, Singapore.
- Arthur Hope-Jones, Minister for Commerce and Industry, Kenya.
- Wallace Macmillan, Administrator, Grenada, Windward Islands.
- Kenneth Phipson Maddocks, Civil Secretary, Northern Region, Nigeria.
- Arthur Crawford Maxwell, Commissioner of Police, Hong Kong.
- Francis Arnold Montague, Administrative Secretary, Sierra Leone.
- Wilfred Padley, OBE, Minister of Finance, Uganda.
- Andrew Hamilton Pike, OBE, Member for Lands and Mines, Tanganyika.
- Alistair Macleod-Smith, Financial Secretary, Western Pacific High Commission.
- Thomas Douglas Vickers, Colonial Secretary, British Honduras.
- Stanley Arthur Walden, Senior Provincial Commissioner, Tanganyika.
- Frank Denry Clement, Williams Financial Secretary, Jamaica.
- Charles Keith Wreford, Senior Resident, Northern Region, Nigeria.
- George Ayton Aynsley, CBE, Foreign Office.
- Trefor Ellis Evans, OBE, Counsellor at Her Majesty's Embassy in Cairo.
- Frederick Charles Everson, lately Counsellor at Her Majesty's Embassy in Bonn.
- Robert David John Scott Fox, Minister with the United Kingdom Delegation to the United Nations, New York.
- The Honourable John Patrick Edward Chandos Henniker-Major, MC, Foreign Office.
- Graham Dudley Lampen, CBE, lately Adviser in London to the Governor General of the Sudan.
- Robert Whyte Mason, Her Majesty's Consul-General at Chicago.
- Charles Frederick George Ransom, OBE, Foreign Office.
- John Ogilvy Rennie, Foreign Office.
- William Coxon Scott, OBE, Foreign Office.
- Riversdale Garland Stone, OBE, Counsellor (Commercial) at Her Majesty's Embassy in Mexico City.
- Gordon Coligny Whitteridge, OBE, lately Counsellor at Her Majesty's Embassy in Bangkok.

=== Royal Victorian Order ===
==== Knight Commander of the Royal Victorian Order (KCVO) ====
- Professor Anthony Frederick Blunt, CVO.
- Lieutenant-Colonel Henry Valentine Bache De Satgé, CMG, CVO, DSO.

==== Commander of the Royal Victorian Order (CVO) ====
- Seymour Joly de Lotbiniere, OBE.
- Francis Galloway Leslie, MRCS, LRCP.
- Colonel William Warren Shaw-Zambra, CBE, TD.

==== Member of the Royal Victorian Order, 4th class (MVO) ====
- Idris Evans.
- Gwynedd Lloyd.
- Henry John Wasbrough.
- Horace Gildard White.
- Stanley Arkell Williams, MVO.

==== Member of the Royal Victorian Order, 5th class (MVO) ====
- Thomas James Barnham.
- Albert William Aylwin Smith.
- Peter Alfred Wright.

=== Order of the British Empire ===
==== Knight Grand Cross of the Order of the British Empire (GBE) ====
Military Division

- General Sir John Francis Martin Whiteley, KCB, CBE, MC (10235), late Corps of Royal Engineers, Colonel Commandant, Corps of Royal Engineers.

Civil Division

- Sir John Maxwell Erskine, CBE, JP, DL, Chairman, Scottish Savings Committee. For public services.

==== Knight Commander of the Order of the British Empire (KBE) ====
Military Division

Royal Navy

- Vice-Admiral John Willson Musgrave Eaton, CB, DSO, DSC.
- Vice-Admiral William Geoffrey Arthur Robson, CB, DSO, DSC.

Army

- Major-General Alexander Douglas Campbell, CB, CBE, DSO, MC (5768), late Corps of Royal Engineers.
- Major-General (honorary) Harold Williams, CB, CBE (11947), late Corps of Royal Engineers (now retired); until recently on loan to the Government of India.
- Major-General (temporary) William Robert Norris Hinde, CB, CBE, DSO, ADC (10830), late Royal Armoured Corps; lately Deputy Director of Operations in Kenya.

Royal Air Force

- Air Marshal Richard Llewellyn Roger Atcherley, CB, CBE, AFC.
- Air Marshal Gilbert Edward Nicholetts, CB, AFC.
- Air Vice-Marshal John René Whitley, CB, CBE, DSO, AFC.

Civil Division

- The Right Honourable Thomas, Baron Glentanar, JP, DL, Chief Scout's Commissioner for Scotland; Member of the Scottish Agricultural Advisory Council.
- Colonel Sir (Frederick) Fergus Graham, Bt, TD, JP, MP, Member of Parliament for North Cumberland, 1926–1935, and for Darlington since 1951. For political and public services.
- Edmund George Harwood, CB, Deputy Secretary, Ministry of Agriculture, Fisheries & Food.
- Sir Edwin Savory Herbert. For public services.
- Hubert Nutcombe Hume, CBE, MC, Deputy Chairman, Colonial Development Corporation, and for other public services.
- Clifford George Jarrett, CB, CBE, Deputy Secretary, Admiralty.
- Sir Thomas Ralph Merton, Treasurer, Royal Society.
- Victor Harry Raby, CB, MC, Deputy Under-Secretary of State, Air Ministry.
- John Kinninmont Dunlop, CMG, CBE, MC, TD, Her Majesty's Consul General at Hamburg.
- Vyvyan Holt, CMG, MVO, lately Her Majesty's Minister at San Salvador.
- The Honourable George Arthur Davenport, CMG, formerly Minister of Mines, Lands & Surveys, Southern Rhodesia. For public services.
- Alexander McDonald Bruce Hutt, CMG, OBE, Administrator, East Africa High Commission.

==== Dame Commander of the Order of the British Empire (DBE) ====
Military Division

- Brigadier Mary Railton, CBE, ADC (Hon.) (192959), Women's Royal Army Corps.

Civil Division

- Peggy Ashcroft, CBE, Actress.

==== Commander of the Order of the British Empire (CBE) ====
Military Division

Royal Navy

- Instructor Captain Ernest Frederick Byng (lately on loan to the Government of India.)
- Kathleen Violet Chapman, RRC, QHNS, Matron-in-Chief, Queen Alexandra's Royal Naval Nursing Service.
- Captain Herbert Lovegrove, (Retd.)
- Acting Captain Harry Ernest Huston Nicholls, OBE, DSC. Senior Officer, Royal Malayan Navy.
- Captain Jasper Parrott, OBE.
- Rear-Admiral Howarth Seymour Walkey (Retd.)

Army

- Colonel (acting) Henry Bardsley, OBE, TD, Manchester Garrison "B" Sector, Home Guard.
- Brigadier (temporary) Robert Hugh Bellamy, DSO (47518), late Infantry.
- Colonel (acting) Robert Cooke, OBE, MC, Holland Sector, Home Guard.
- Colonel Cecil James Corbin (26286), late Infantry (now RARO.).
- Brigadier (temporary) Donald Maxwell Cornah, DSO (38591), late Infantry.
- Brigadier (temporary) Cecil Martin Fothergill Deakin (49812), late Foot Guards.
- Brigadier Hugh Edward Fernyhough, DSO (30526), late Royal Regiment of Artillery (now RARO.)
- Brigadier (temporary) Gerald Loftus Fitzgerald, DSO (36596), late Royal Regiment of Artillery.
- Brigadier Desmond St. John Hoysted (34459), late Royal Corps of Signals.
- Brigadier (temporary) John Edgar Frank Meadmore (26991), Royal Regiment of Artillery.
- Major-General Alfred Henry Musson (6094), late Royal Regiment of Artillery.
- Brigadier Arthur Raymond Purches, OBE (41257), late Royal Army Service Corps.
- Colonel Mary Kathleen Crewe-Read, TD (192954), Women's Royal Army Corps (now RARO.)
- Brigadier (temporary) James Alexander Rowland Robertson, DSO, OBE. (384323), late Infantry.
- Colonel (acting) Stuart Reginald Moss Vernon, MC, TD (47892), Army Cadet Force.
- Brigadier (temporary) Robert John Volkers, OBE (39205), Royal Army Ordnance Corps.

Royal Air Force

- Air Vice-Marshal Michael Joseph Pigott, BDS, FDSRCS, QHDS.
- Air Commodore Henry Bertram Wrigley.
- The Reverend Esmond Whitehall Patrick Ainsworth.
- Group Captain Richard Eric Burns, DFC.
- Group Captain Desmond Patrick Hanafin, DFC, AFC.
- Group Captain Edward Gordon Jones, DSO, OBE, DFC.
- Group Captain Arthur Bookey Riall, OBE, Royal Air Force Regiment.
- Group Captain Peter Wolryche Stansfeld, DFC.
- Group Captain Ralph William Wallace, (Retd.)
- Group Captain Edward George Watkins, AFC.
- Group Captain Samuel Wroath, AFC.

Civil Division

- Captain John Steele Allan, DL, lately Chairman, White Fish Authority's Committee for Scotland and Northern Ireland.
- William Beardoe Atkin, Director, General Manager and Secretary, Newcastle & Gateshead Water Company.
- William Henry Bale, JP. For political and public services in Reading.
- Raymond Percival Beddow, Executive Director, British Electric Traction Co. Ltd.
- Leslie Herbert Bedford, OBE, Chief Engineer, Guided Weapons Division, English Electric Co. Ltd.
- Lewis Boddington, Deputy Chief Scientific Officer, Ministry of Supply.
- Frank Philip Bowden, Reader in Physical Chemistry, University of Cambridge.
- Harry Archibald Brading, Superintendent, Operative Department, Royal Mint.
- Percival Laurence Leigh-Breese, JP. For services to Housing.
- William Donald Wykeham Brooks, DM, FRCP, Consulting Physician to the Royal Navy.
- Frank Collin Brown, Chief Housing and Planning Inspector, Ministry of Housing and Local Government.
- Major the Honourable Robert Bruce, JP, DL, Member, Advisory Panel on Highlands and Islands.
- Captain Edward Denman Clarke, MC, Managing Director, Saunders-Roe Ltd., Cowes, Isle of Wight.
- John Selby Clements, Actor, Manager and Producer.
- Harold Conolly, County Architect, Essex.
- Theodore Constantine. For political and public services in Middlesex.
- Robert Keith Craig, Superintendent Engineer, Shaw Savill & Albion Co. Ltd.
- William Foy Cresswell, Senior Official Receiver in Bankruptcy, Board of Trade.
- Russell Mackenzie Currie, Head of Work Study Department, Imperial Chemical Industries Ltd.
- Sidney James Dibble, Director of Supply and Transport, Home Office.
- Edward William Ditchburn, OBE, Director, Fighting Vehicles Production, Ministry of Supply.
- John Robert Vernon Dolphin, TD, Chief Engineer, Atomic Weapons Research Establishment, United Kingdom Atomic Energy Authority.
- Leslie Newman Duguid, Deputy Chief Inspector of Factories, Ministry of Labour & National Service.
- George Frank Edwards, Chief Land Agent, Agricultural Land Commission.
- John Marten Llewellyn Evans, MBE, TD, Official Solicitor, Supreme Court of Judicature.
- Thomas Evans, JP, Alderman, Glamorgan County Council; Chairman of the United Hospitals, Cardiff.
- Henry Fazackerley. For political and public services in Preston.
- Colonel John Charles Wynne Finch, MC, Chairman Welsh Agricultural Land Sub-Commission.
- Samuel Alexander Sadler Forster, Chairman, North Eastern Trading Estates Ltd.
- Allan Stewart Fortune, TD, Chief Inspector, Department of Agriculture for Scotland.
- George Matthew Fyfe, MB, FRCP(Ed.), Medical Officer of Health, Fife County.
- Leonard Fonnereau Gibbon, HM Inspector of Schools (Staff Inspector), Ministry of Education.
- William James Gilmore, Assistant Secretary, Ministry of Works.
- Robert Yorke Goodden, Designer, Professor of Design, Department of Silversmithing, Royal College of Art.
- Edward Thomas Green. For services to agriculture in Northern Ireland.
- Alderman James Mantle Greenwood, JP. For political and public services in Southwark.
- George Maurice Hann. Lately full-time member of the Industrial Court.
- Brigadier Kenneth Hargreaves, MBE, TD, DL. For political and public services in Yorkshire.
- Philip D'Arcy Hart, MD, FRCP, Director, Tuberculosis Research Unit, Medical Research Council.
- Reginald George Hayden, Assistant Secretary, Board of Customs & Excise.
- Albert Heiser, Deputy Director of Stores, Admiralty.
- Geoffrey Vernon Brooke Herford, OBE, Deputy Chief Scientific Officer, Pest Infestation Laboratory, Department of Scientific & Industrial Research.
- Tahu Ronald Pearce Hole, Editor, News, British Broadcasting Corporation.
- William Hughes, OBE, Lord Provost of Dundee.
- Christopher Edward Clive Hussey. For services to Architecture.
- Arthur Webb Isherwood, Director of Contracts (Air), Ministry of Supply.
- Alfred Thomas Jones, Deputy Secretary, Exchequer & Audit Department.
- John Kenneth Trevor Jones, Assistant Legal Adviser, Home Office.
- Robert Kean, OBE, Director, Federation of Civil Engineering Contractors.
- Claude Henry Leddra, OBE, Manager, Constructive Department, HM Dockyard Devonport.
- Edwin Philip Le Masurier, OBE, lately Lieutenant Bailiff of Jersey.
- George Roland Begley McConnell MBE, Assistant Secretary, Ministry of Education, Northern Ireland.
- William McKinney, Vice-Chairman, Northern Ireland Hospitals Authority.
- Colonel Lachlan Mackinnon, DSO, TD. For political and public services in Aberdeen.
- Thomas Hogarth McLaren, MC, Managing Director, Baxter Bros. & Co. Ltd., Dundee.
- Colin McLean. For political and public services in Norfolk.
- Adrian Bernard Mann, OBE, Chief Mechanical and Electrical Engineer, Ministry of Works.
- Harry Marshall, JP. For political and public services in Manchester.
- Kenneth Mather, Professor of Genetics, University of Birmingham.
- John Megaw, TD, QC, Member of the Industrial Injuries Advisory Council.
- Charles Melville Melville, MC, Assistant Solicitor, Metropolitan Police Force.
- Luther Frederick Milner, OBE, JP, Chairman, Sheffield Savings Committee.
- James Kydd Moir, JP. For political and public services in Angus.
- George Vernon Northcott, Chairman, St. Loyes College for the Disabled, Exeter.
- Maurice Oldfield, MBE, Assistant Secretary, Foreign Office.
- Hugh Owen, JP, Chairman, Caernarvonshire Agricultural Executive Committee.
- James McAlpine Owen, Regional Director, Home Counties Region, General Post Office.
- Henry Edward Pardoe, lately President, Manchester Chamber of Commerce.
- John Davidson Peattie, Chief Engineer, Central Electricity Authority.
- Elsa Rose Perkins, OBE, Chairman, National Street & Village Groups Advisory Savings Sub-Committee.
- Sidney Percival Peters, Deputy Director (Forecasting), Meteorological Office, Air Ministry.
- Mary Gladys Philpot, Headmistress, Coborn School for Girls, London.
- Major Arthur William Pilgrim, OBE, Regional Representative for Greater London, British Red Cross Society.
- Anthony Dymoke Powell, Writer.
- Edith Mary Price, BEM, Senior Registrar, HM Land Registry.
- Herbert Spencer Price, OBE, Chief Constable, Bradford City Police Force.
- Ernest Read, Professor, Royal Academy of Music.
- David Morgan Rees, Chairman, South Western Division, National Coal Board.
- Norman Charles Rowland, Assistant Secretary, Ministry of Health.
- Alexander Samuels, Chairman, London & Home Counties Traffic Advisory Committee.
- Charles Weatheritt Scott, Divisional Inspector of Mines & Quarries, North Eastern Division, Ministry of Fuel & Power.
- Hubert Arthur Secretan, OBE, JP. For services to Boys' Clubs.
- Arnold Edward Sewell, Permanent Member of the Transport Tribunal, Ministry of Transport & Civil Aviation.
- Lieutenant-Colonel Thomas Eustace Smith, TD, DL, Managing Director, Smith's Dock Co. Ltd., North Shields.
- Hugh Stannus Stannus, MD, FRCP, Medical Officer, Board of Inland Revenue.
- Bernard Donald Storey, OBE, Town Clerk, Norwich.
- John Sullivan, part-time member of the South of Scotland Electricity Board; Chairman, Electricity Consultative Council for the South of Scotland District.
- Charles Sykes, Managing Director, Thomas Firth & John Brown Ltd.
- William Gilbert Taplin, OBE, Assistant Secretary, Ministry of Labour & National Service.
- Ernest Edward Taylor, Chairman of the Board of Governors, Royal National Throat, Nose and Ear Hospital.
- Captain Percival Chatterton Thompson, MC, Chairman, West Riding of Yorkshire Agricultural Executive Committee.
- Norman Walter Gwynn Tucker, Director and Opera Producer, Sadler's Wells Theatre.
- Sydney George Turner, OBE, QC. For public services in Essex.
- Thomas Henry Huxley Turner, lately Chairman, Cwmbran Development Corporation, Monmouthshire.
- Professor Frank Edward Tylecote, FRCP, Chairman, Public Health Committee, Association of Municipal Corporations.
- Harry Ward, OBE, Head of Treaty & Nationality Department, Foreign Office.
- Arthur Benjamin Watts, Director of British Ropes (Southern Sales) Ltd, Doncaster.
- George Campbell White. For political and public services in North-East England.
- Ernest Wilkinson, OBE, Regional Controller, Outer London, Ministry of Pensions & National Insurance.
- Frank Clare Wilkinson, MD, FDS, RCS, Director of Eastman Dental Hospital and Dean of Institute of Dental Surgery, University of London.
- Foster Neville Woodward, Director, Institute of Seaweed Research.
- Ambrose William Wray, OBE, Assistant Secretary, Ministry of Transport & Civil Aviation.

- Arthur Eber Sydney Charles, lately Director of Establishments, Sudan Government.
- Arthur Edwin Crouchley, lately First Secretary at Her Majesty's Embassy in Berne.
- John Coles Eyre, Agricultural Adviser, Middle East Development Division (Lebanon).
- Cecil Albert Good, President of the Court of Appeal for Cyrenaica.
- James McDonald, OBE, Her Majesty's Consul at Portland, Oregon.
- Duncan Archibald Newby, British subject resident in Egypt.
- Frank Collinge Ogden, Her Majesty's Consul-General at Gothenburg.
- William John Rayner, lately Counsellor (Regional Information Officer), Office of the Commissioner-General for Her Majesty's Government in the United Kingdom in South-East Asia.
- George Edgar Vaughan, OBE, Her Majesty's Consul-General at Amsterdam.
- Louis Reginald Samuel Benjamin, General Superintendent, Australian Newsprint Mills Ltd. For public services in the State of Tasmania.
- Thomas Patrick Murray Cochran. For political and public services in the Federation of Rhodesia and Nyasaland.
- Nathaniel Bernard Freeman. For services to public and charitable organisations in the State of New South Wales.
- Heiman Joseph Hoffman, Judge of the Water Court, and President of the Town Planning Court, Southern Rhodesia.
- Charles Holly McKay. For services to the Victorian Branch of the Returned Sailors', Soldiers', & Airmen's Imperial League of Australia.
- Leonard James Ternouth Pellew, MB, FRCS. For services to the Fire Brigade and other organisations in the State of South Australia.
- Francis Ernest Piper, President of the Law Society, State of South Australia.
- William John Smith, Managing Director, Australian Consolidated Industries Ltd. For public services in the State of New South Wales.
- Robert Mackinlay Taylor, Secretary to the Treasury, Federation of Rhodesia and Nyasaland.
- Robert Joseph Webster, MC, General Manager and Managing Director, Bradford Cotton Mills Ltd. For public services in the State of New South Wales.
- Oba Adendi-Adeleii, Paramount Chief of Lagos, Federation of Nigeria.
- Charles Barren Bisset, Director of Geological Survey, Tanganyika.
- Frank Ernest Lovell Carter, OBE, Oversea Audit Service, Director of Audit, Hong Kong.
- Sydney Theophilus Christian, OBE. For public services in Antigua, Leeward Islands.
- Charles Edward Cousins, Labour Commissioner, Northern Rhodesia.
- Oswald Vernon Garratt, OBE, Commissioner of Prisons, Federation of Malaya.
- Roland Edwardes Hales. For public services in Brunei.
- Umar Ibn Ibrahim El Kanemi, Emir of Dikwa, Northern Region, Nigeria.
- Douglas Halford Lawson, lately Director of Public Works, Western Region, Nigeria.
- The Right Reverend Ezra Douglas Martinson, MBE, Assistant Bishop of Accra, Gold Coast.
- Hallam Grey Massiah, MD, CM. For public services in Barbados.
- Graeme Mitchell Mill Menzies, MB, ChB, Deputy Chief Medical Adviser for the Federal Government, Federation of Nigeria.
- Albert Jerome Alphonso Momoh, Member of Public Service Commission, Sierra Leone.
- Lieutenant-Colonel Frederick Paltridge, DSO, ED, Director of Posts & Telecommunications, Gold Coast.
- James Erskine Peat, Deputy Senior Officer, Empire Cotton Growing Corporation, Tanganyika.
- The Right Reverend Monsignor Carmelo Psaila. For services to the Arts in Malta.
- Patrick Wimberley Dill-Russell, MRCS, LRCP, Director of Medical Services, Cyprus.
- Geoffrey Haward Smellie. For public services in British Guiana.
- Captain Malin Sorsbie, OBE, lately General Manager, East African Airways Corporation.
- Henry Walter Stevens. For public services in Nyasaland.
- Norman Wilfred Tang, Minister of Health & Local Government, Trinidad.
- William Urquhart, OBE, Deputy General Manager, East African Railways & Harbours Administration.
- Robert Bruce Wallace, DSO, MC, MB, ChB. For medical services in Kedah, Federation of Malaya.
- Algernon Wear, Director of Public Works, Singapore.
- Horace White, MBE, Director of Information, Uganda.
- Grahame Williamson, OBE, Principal, Veterinary School, Federation of Nigeria.

Honorary Commander

- Kamaruddin bin Idris, Mentri Besar, Trengganu, Federation of Malaya.

==== Officer of the Order of the British Empire (OBE) ====
Military Division

Royal Navy

- Instructor Commander Albert John Bellamy.
- Commander Harold Clement Outram Bull.
- Acting Captain Francis Jack Cartwright.
- Lieutenant-Commander George Albert Collis.
- Major Arthur Ernest Ebsworth, BEM, Royal Marines (Retd.)
- Acting Commander Frederick James Hedges, Royal Malayan Navy.
- Commander Cecil Walter Hillman.
- The Reverend Walter Jeffreys Marson, Chaplain.
- Commander Philip Dennis O'Brien, (Retd.)
- Harold Marshall Pearson, Chief Engineer, RFA Service.
- Lieutenant-Commander David Allan Robert Malcolm Ramsay, DSC.
- Commander Alexander Gordon Reid.
- Commander (E) Sidney George Taylor, (Retd.)
- Commander (A) Bert Walwyn Vigrass, Royal Naval Volunteer Reserve.

Army

- Lieutenant-Colonel (temporary) Ronald Lewis Allen (125545), Royal Army Ordnance Corps.
- Lieutenant-Colonel (temporary) William Peter Marcus Allen, MC (63620), The Middlesex Regiment (Duke of Cambridge's Own).
- Lieutenant-Colonel Desmond Gerald Rowan Atkinson (50962), The King's Own Yorkshire Light Infantry (Employed List (1)).
- Lieutenant-Colonel (temporary) (local Colonel) Alexander Clare Cunningham Brodie, DSO, MC (53740), The Black Watch (Royal Highland Regiment).
- Lieutenant-Colonel (acting) Robert Anderson Corby, TD (78219), The Parachute Regiment, Territorial Army.
- Lieutenant-Colonel Thomas Percival Cracknell, MBE, MC (168070), Royal Regiment of Artillery.
- Lieutenant-Colonel (temporary) Willoughby Frank Cubitt (67027), Royal Regiment of Artillery.
- Lieutenant-Colonel (acting) John Harold Joseph Dickins, TD, 3rd Derbyshire Battalion, Home Guard.
- Lieutenant-Colonel Leslie Watson James Dryland (36513), Royal Corps of Signals
- Lieutenant-Colonel Hugh Kenworthy Gillson (44859), Royal Regiment of Artillery.
- Lieutenant-Colonel (temporary) John Belford Arthur Glennie, DSO (63600), The Royal Sussex Regiment.
- Lieutenant-Colonel (local Colonel) Rhys Anthony Gwyn (49853), The Middlesex Regiment (Duke of Cambridge's Own) (Employed List (1)).
- Lieutenant-Colonel Rowland Graham Hill, MBE (50943), The Dorset Regiment (Employed List (1)).
- Lieutenant-Colonel Edward Patrick Kelly, ERD (66460), Royal Army Service Corps.
- Lieutenant-Colonel Edward George Aldred Kynaston, TD (102282), Westminster Dragoons (2nd County of London Yeomanry), Royal Armoured Corps, Territorial Army.
- Lieutenant-Colonel (temporary) Eric Frank Kyte, MBE (66044), Corps of Royal Engineers.
- Lieutenant-Colonel (Brevet Colonel) James Hastie Macleod, TD. (69671), Corps of Royal Engineers, Territorial Army (now TARO.).
- Lieutenant-Colonel Donald MacLean Main, TD (57597), Royal Regiment of Artillery, Territorial Army.
- The Reverend Laurence William Mathews, TD (88478), Chaplain to the Forces, Second Class, Royal Army Chaplains' Department.
- Lieutenant-Colonel Herbert William James Morrell, MC (68102), Royal Regiment of Artillery, Territorial Army.
- The Reverend John Basil Morson, MC, TD, (93368), Chaplain to the Forces, Second Class (acting), Royal Army Chaplains' Department, Territorial Army.
- Lieutenant-Colonel (acting) Henry Jones Porter, TD (160353), Royal Regiment of Artillery, Territorial Army.
- Lieutenant-Colonel (acting) Henry Ross Power, 10th/11th Surrey Battalion, Home Guard.
- Lieutenant-Colonel (temporary) David Edward Long-Price (69313), The Essex Regiment.
- Lieutenant-Colonel Maurice David-Price, MBE (64554), Royal Corps of Signals.
- Lieutenant-Colonel (acting) Louis de Courcy Fitzpatrick Robertson, MBE (16649), Combined Cadet Force.
- Lieutenant-Colonel (now Colonel) Charles Portland Robinson, MC, TD (56501), late Royal Regiment of Artillery, Territorial Army.
- Major Maurice Francis Ronayne, MBE, MB (135396), Royal Army Medical Corps, Territorial Army.
- Lieutenant-Colonel (temporary) Arthur Rowland, MBE, MC (105968), The Queen's Bays (2nd Dragoon Guards), Royal Armoured Corps.
- Brevet Lieutenant-Colonel Frederick Herbert Margetson Rushmore, MBE (69748), Royal Regiment of Artillery.
- Lieutenant-Colonel William Alexander Salmon (47679), The Highland Light Infantry (City of Glasgow Regiment).
- Lieutenant-Colonel (temporary) John Deighton Egerton Egerton-Smith, MBE (65265), The Cheshire Regiment.
- Lieutenant-Colonel Ernest Albert Smyth, MB, FRCS (70120), Royal Army Medical Corps.
- Lieutenant-Colonel John Joseph Sullivan, MB (65521), Royal Army Medical Corps.
- Lieutenant-Colonel (temporary) John Warwick Tomes, MBE (73107), The Royal Warwickshire Regiment.
- Lieutenant-Colonel (temporary) (now Major) Peter Alfred Lincoln Vaux (73202), Royal Tank Regiment, Royal Armoured Corps.
- Lieutenant-Colonel (temporary) Christopher Dalmahoy Waters, MBE (66053), Corps of Royal Engineers.
- Lieutenant-Colonel John White (67932), Royal Army Service Corps.
- Lieutenant-Colonel (acting) Harry Witchell, MC, TD, 9th Cheshire Battalion, Home Guard.
- Lieutenant-Colonel (acting) Frank Zealley, MBE (283540), Army Cadet Force.
- Colonel (temporary) Reginald William Day (42464), Corps of Royal Electrical & Mechanical Engineers; at present on loan to the Government of India.
- Lieutenant-Colonel Eric Ritchie Fothergill, MC, Southern Rhodesia Artillery, Territorial Force.
- Colonel Donald Roslyn Evan Owens, Basutoland Mounted Police.

Royal Air Force

- Wing Commander George Craig (133755).
- Wing Commander Robert Edward Craven, DFC (39859).
- Wing Commander Peter Stanley Dundas, (21235).
- Wing Commander John Ellis, DFC & Bar (37850).
- Wing Commander Edward Hearl (44098).
- Wing Commander George Augustus Hine (31302).
- Wing Commander James Edward Manton (35371).
- Wing Commander Danbigh Leon Norris-Smith (58789).
- Wing Commander Gordon William Price (46484).
- Wing Commander Frederick Martin Veasey (44611).
- Wing Commander Alfred James Wild (35294).
- Wing Commander Kenneth Burnett Shelton Willder (78313).
- Acting Wing Commander John Nigel Carlyle Cooke, MD, BS (201232).
- Acting Wing Commander John Denis Bernard Manning (62928), Royal Air Force Volunteer Reserve (Training Branch).
- Acting Wing Commander John Frederick Powell (73348).
- Acting Wing Commander James Thom (35247).
- Squadron Leader Frank William Carter (50412).
- Squadron Leader Douglas Henry Luck, DFC. (48662).
- Squadron Leader Harold Charles Molyneux (46961).
- Bimbashi Al Awal Ali Mohamed Aulaqi (2245), Aden Protectorate Levies.
- Wing Commander Compton William Kemp (46575), Royal Air Force; at present on loan to the Government of Pakistan.
- Squadron Leader Clifford Philpot (51156), Royal Air Force; lately on loan to the Government of Pakistan.

Civil Division

- Ronald Alderson, Chief Constable, Monmouthshire Constabulary.
- Sidney Maurice Allen, Controller, Valuation Branch, Board of Customs & Excise.
- Eleanor Gream Antrobus, Honorary Secretary, Overseas Nursing Association.
- Edward Armstrong, MD, Senior Medical Officer, Ministry of Health & Local Government, Northern Ireland.
- Alderman Arthur Ashton, JP. For public services in Leamington Spa.
- Marguerite Frances Martin Atkinson Bishop, MBE, lately Director, British Leather Federation.
- Margaret Avery, Senior Lecturer, Avery Hill Teacher Training College, Eltham.
- Philip Hope Edward Bagenal, DCM, Architect. For services in the field of acoustics.
- Geoffrey Barlow, Managing Director, Meters Ltd., Manchester.
- Michael Barry, Head of Drama, Television Service, British Broadcasting Corporation.
- Hugh Raymond Beer, Port Dried Fruits Officer, London, Ministry of Agriculture, Fisheries & Food.
- Frank Belcher, Deputy Director, Supply Ground Services (Civil Aviation) Division, Ministry of Transport & Civil Aviation.
- William Herbert Bennett, Assistant Staff Officer, Ulster Special Constabulary.
- Leo Cyril Aloysius Benson, Senior District Inspector of Mines & Quarries, North Western Division, Ministry of Fuel & Power.
- John Gibb Bothwell, Scottish Secretary, Transport Salaried Staffs' Association.
- Captain Malcolm Rene Bouquet, Chairman, Housing Committee, Amersham Rural District Council, Buckinghamshire.
- Florence Elizabeth Breakie, JP. For political and public services in Belfast.
- The Reverend Cyril James Brown, General Superintendent, Missions to Seamen.
- Isa Burns Brown, lately General Secretary, Women's Foreign Mission of the Church of Scotland.
- Walter James Brown, Principal Regional Architect, South Western Region, Ministry of Housing & Local Government.
- Reginald Arthur Browning, Director of Contracts, United Kingdom Atomic Energy Authority.
- William Dover Way Buckell, MC, Chairman, Isle of Wight National Insurance Local Tribunal.
- Hugh Sidney Bushell, Assistant Editor, Review of Applied Entomology, Commonwealth Agricultural Bureaux.
- Thomas Tucker-Edwardes Cadett, Chief Paris Correspondent of the British Broadcasting Corporation.
- Vera Margaret Carmichael. For political services in Edinburgh.
- Anne Beatrice Casement. For political and public services in County Antrim.
- Leonard Edward Caygill, Assistant Director, Directorate of Civil Aircraft Research & Development, Ministry of Supply.
- Alderman John Wythe Salter Chalker, JP, Chairman, Headquarters Diseases of Animals Committee, National Farmers' Union.
- Frederick Brown Chapman. For political and public services in the County of Holland.
- Reeves Charlesworth, Chairman, Reeves Charlesworth Ltd., Building Contractors, Sheffield.
- Alderman Thomas Clayton. For public services in Cheshire.
- Hamish Hustler Howard, Coates District Probate Registrar, Wakefield.
- Reginald Arthur Colwill. For services to the Amateur Swimming Association.
- Bertram Cope, Assistant Accountant General, Ministry of Pensions & National Insurance.
- John Cormack, Principal, Bootle Technical College, Lancashire.
- Douglas Jack Craggs, Deputy Regional Controller, North Midlands, Ministry of Labour & National Service.
- Arthur Crawley, Superintending Naval Store Officer, HM Dockyard, Malta.
- Alan John Pitts Crick, Deputy Assistant Director, Joint Intelligence Bureau, Washington, Ministry of Defence.
- John Capel Croome, Superintending Armament Supply Officer, Royal Naval Armament Depot, Upnor, Kent.
- William Newcomb Cryer, MBE, Chief Commissioner, National Savings Committee.
- John Chisholm Davidson, Divisional Veterinary Officer, Ministry of Agriculture, Fisheries & Food.
- Alan Warburton Davson, Senior Partner, Davson & Pritchard, Chartered Quantity Surveyors.
- The Right Honourable Nina Marion, Baroness Deramore. For services as County President, East Riding of Yorkshire, British Red Cross Society.
- Alan Fullforth Dobson, Superintending Civil Engineer (Higher Grade), Admiralty.
- John Donald Douglas, Operations Planning Manager, British Overseas Airways Corporation.
- Helen Drummond, Principal, Dunfermline College of Physical Education, Aberdeen.
- William Duff, Principal Officer, Ministry of Home Affairs, Northern Ireland.
- Alexander Robert Dunbar, MBE, Assistant General Manager, North Eastern Region (York), British Railways, British Transport Commission.
- Bertrand James Howell Eaton, Headmaster, Portchester Secondary School for Boys, Bournemouth.
- James Henry Edmondson, General Manager and Engineer, Sewage Disposal Department, Sheffield.
- Septimus John Emms, Superintending Valuer, Board of Inland Revenue.
- Enid Constance Evans, MRCS, LRCP, Senior Medical Officer, HM Treasury.
- Alexander Bruce MacDonald Ferguson, Jute Controller, Board of Trade.
- Albert Edward Fitness, Principal, Air Ministry.
- Frederick Douglas Fitz-Gerald, Secretary, Traders Road Transport Association.
- Robert Joseph Fitzmaurice, Assistant Director of Contracts, Ministry of Works.
- John Denis Foreman, lately Director, British Film Institute.
- George Frederick Forwood. For political and public services in Surrey.
- Horace Frost, Chief Executive Officer, Air Ministry.
- Alastair Douglas Fyfe. For political and public services in Northumberland.
- Major James Gardiner, JP. For political and public services in Lancashire.
- William Glen. For services as Secretary and Treasurer, City of Glasgow Society of Social Service.
- Edward William Golding, Head of the Department of Rural Electrification & Wind Power, Electrical Research Association.
- Colonel Sydney Green, TD, Senior Civil Engineer, Metropolitan Division, Ministry of Transport & Civil Aviation.
- Frederick Greenwood, Senior Chief Executive Officer, Export Credits Guarantee Department.
- William Birch Greenwood, Regional Controller, National Assistance Board.
- George Clifford Ashman Greetham, Chief Structural Engineer, Ministry of Works.
- Arthur Leslie Grinyer, lately Naval Constructor, Admiralty.
- Captain Austin Grist, MBE, MC, Chairman, Ryde & Bembridge Savings Committee.
- Louis Auguste Guillemette, MBE. States Supervisor, Guernsey.
- Frederick James Harlow, MBE, Assistant Educational Adviser to the Secretary of State for the Colonies.
- Reginald George Harris, Deputy Chief Land Agent & Valuer, War Office.
- Lieutenant-Colonel Richard Gowland Gaskell Harvey, DSO, Secretary, Counties of Londonderry, Tyrone & Fermanagh Territorial and Auxiliary Forces Association.
- Clifford Heyes, Superintending Mechanical and Electrical Engineer, Grade I, Air Ministry.
- Allen Shepard Higlett, District Auditor, Ministry of Housing & Local Government.
- John Acland Hinks, JP, Chartered Surveyor to the Churches Main Committee.
- Robert Norman Ellis Hinton. For political and public services in Hertfordshire.
- Frank William Hitchinson, Chief Officer, Caernarvonshire Fire Brigade.
- Captain Hartley Holmes, General Secretary, Officers' Christian Union.
- Frederick John Hooker, Assistant Accountant General, Ministry of Supply.
- Cyril Onslow Horn, Deputy Regional Director, London Telecommunications Region, General Post Office.
- Sidney Walter Ernest Horsman, Principal Collector of Taxes, Board of Inland Revenue.
- Kenneth Albert Horwood, Assistant Chief Constable, Kent County Constabulary.
- Alderman Reginald Spencer Howard. For political and public services in Brentford and Chiswick.
- Alfred Bernard Howe, Assistant Head, Research Department, British Broadcasting Corporation.
- Reginald Alfred Hughes, Chief Executive Officer, Ministry of Agriculture, Fisheries & Food.
- William Hunter, JP, Member of Governing Board, North of Scotland College of Agriculture.
- James Leggat Hyslop, JP, Engineer and Manager, Belfast Gasworks.
- Godfrey Phineas Godfrey-Isaacs. Chairman of the Managers, Park House Approved School, Godalming.
- Albert Richard Jackson, Chairman, Manchester Wing Committee, Air Training Corps.
- Allan Edward Moxham Janes, Secretary, High Wycombe Furniture Manufacturers' Society.
- Marcus Lionel Jofeh, Deputy Chief Engineer, Sperry Gyroscope Co. Ltd., Brentford, Middlesex.
- Ivor John, Senior Chief Executive Officer, War Office.
- Ernest Harris Jolley, Staff Engineer, Engineer-in-Chiefs Office, General Post Office.
- Elwyn Owen Jones, JP, Member, Brecon Agricultural Executive Committee.
- Eric Wynne-Jones Deputy Surveyor, New Forest, Forestry Commission.
- Thomas Walter Cynog-Jones, Head of Research Department, Union of Shop, Distributive and Allied Workers.
- Arthur Robert Judge, Principal, Home Office.
- Warren Hastings Kaye, Chairman, Leeds Stock Exchange; President of the Council of Associated Stock Exchanges.
- William Garnet Kent, Provincial Horticultural Advisory Officer, Grade I, Ministry of Agriculture, Fisheries & Food.
- Allan Hugh King, Principal, Ministry of Health.
- Alderman Cyril Sherwin Knight, JP, Chairman, Chatham Local Employment Committee.
- Eric Vincent Knight, Farm Manager, Field Station, Compton, Berkshire Agricultural Research Council.
- James Duncan Lawson, JP, Provost of the Royal Burgh of Pittenweem, Fife.
- Arthur Henry Layhe Manager (Purchasing), British Insulated Callender's Cables Ltd.
- Gilbert Ledward, RA, Sculptor. For services to the Royal Mint.
- Frank Sidney Hume Lemon, The Joint Managing Director, Submarine Cables Ltd., Greenwich.
- Arnold Herbert Lewis, Director, Jealott's Hill Research Station, Imperial Chemical Industries Ltd.
- Commander John Henry Lewty, Royal Navy (Retd.), Chief Inspector, HM Coastguard, Ministry of Transport & Civil Aviation.
- Thomas Henry Longstaff, County Surveyor, and County Planning Officer, Huntingdonshire.
- Evelyn Isabella Ada McCord. For public services in Romford.
- Michael McEnaney, Waterguard Superintendent, Newcastle upon Tyne, Board of Customs & Excise.
- Martha McKee, Matron, City Hospital, Belfast.
- Colin Lee McKenzie, Principal Examiner, Patent Office, Board of Trade.
- Alderman Charles McVey, JP, Chairman, Birkenhead Local Employment Committee.
- James Fitzgerald Malcolm, Head of Department and Lecturer in Bacteriology, West of Scotland Agricultural College.
- Kathleen Martin, Matron, Hope Hospital, Salford, Lancashire.
- Walter Harry Martin, Technical Adviser, London North Eastern & Eastern Regions, Central Land Board and War Damage Commission.
- Herbert Maryon, Temporary Curator, Research Laboratory, British Museum.
- Cyril Aubyn Masterman, Technical Director, Underground Gasification Trials, Ministry of Fuel & Power.
- Colonel Albert Jim Masterson, DL. For services as Secretary, County of Warwick Territorial & Auxiliary Forces Association.
- John Strachan Mearns, Chief Engineer, MV Sekondi, Elder Dempster Lines Ltd.
- Andrew Meldrum, Chief Constable, Fife Constabulary.
- Stanley Middleton, Senior Highways Officer, Northern Army Group, War Office.
- Harold Midgley, Deputy Chairman, South Western Electricity Board.
- William Phillips Miller, JP, Director, James N. Miller & Sons Ltd., Boatbuilders, St. Monance, Fife.
- Lennox Milne McLaren, Actress and Producer, Gateway Theatre Company, Edinburgh.
- The Right Honourable Marion, Countess of Minto. For political and charitable services in Scotland.
- Dennis Hugh Morgan, MBE, Deputy Controller for Wales, Board of Trade.
- George Morton, General Manager, State Management Districts, Scotland.
- William John Mould, Chairman, Birmingham Federation of Boys' Clubs.
- John Mowat, Grade 2 Officer, Ministry of Labour & National Service.
- Ernest Illingworth Musgrave, Director, Leeds City Art Gallery and Temple Newsam House, Leeds.
- Alderman Frank Charles Newling, JP, Chairman, Ministry of Agriculture, Fisheries & Food Experimental Farms Committee for Terrington St. Clement and Kirton.
- Charles Eric Nicol, Secretary, North East Metropolitan Regional Hospital Board.
- Alfred Robert Nobes, JP, Alderman, Gosport Borough Council, Hampshire.
- Henry Noble, Chairman, H. Noble (Coopers) Ltd., Bradford.
- Joseph Harold Orrell, lately Chief Test Pilot, A. V. Roe & Co. Ltd.
- Thomas William Owen, Regional House Coal Officer, Wales Region.
- Humphrey Leslie Malcolm Oxley, Senior Legal Assistant, Commonwealth Relations Office.
- Thomas William Palmer Vice-President, British Goat Society.
- Septimus Partington, DCM, Internal Head of Works, Salford Electrical Instruments, Ltd, Lancashire.
- Doris Winifred Pearson, MBE, Assistant Secretary, British Academy.
- George Edward Pegram, Chief Welfare Officer, Essex County Council.
- Thomas Pickering, Chief Geologist, Colonial Development Corporation.
- Margaret Pilkington, Honorary Director, Whitworth Art Gallery, Manchester.
- William Alfred Pinkerton, Chairman, County Antrim Committee of Agriculture.
- Herbert Harold Potter. Attached War Office.
- Bertram Thomas Powell. For political services.
- Cyril Seymour Coode Prance, MB, BS, JP, Commissioner, St. John Ambulance Brigade for Plymouth, South West Devon and East Cornwall.
- John Craven Pritchard, Director and Secretary, Furniture Development Council.
- Lieutenant-Colonel Jonathan Moberly Pumphrey, TD, DL, MBE, Production Director, Northern (Northumberland & Cumberland) Division, National Coal Board.
- Paul Reed, Director, Information Department, British Council.
- Leslie Ernest Room. For political and public services in Hampstead.
- Alexander Noble Roxburgh, FRCS, Consultant Surgeon, Northern Regional Hospital Board.
- Averil Russell, MBE, General Secretary, Women's Voluntary Services.
- Kenneth Hugh Sachse, MBE, Assistant Secretary, Foreign Office.
- Charles Ernest Salt, MB, ChB, JP. For public services in Denbighshire.
- Christopher John Saltmarshe, lately Editor, Monitoring Service, British Broadcasting Service (now Editor, London Calling.)
- Henry Sanders, JP, lately Head of Farnham Evening Institute, Surrey.
- Elsie Schofield, Superintending Inspector of Factories, Ministry of Labour & National Service.
- John Maurice Shaftesley, Editor of The Jewish Chronicle, London.
- Alexander Shanks, MC, lately Chairman, Birmingham Executive Council, National Health Service.
- William Gordon Sharp, Director, Armour & Co. Ltd., Smithfield, London, EC.
- Michael Edward Silberston, Chairman, Bethnal Green Savings Committee.
- Muriel Sissons. For political and public services in the East Riding of Yorkshire.
- Reginald Stanley Smart, Senior Chief Executive Officer, Board of Trade.
- Alexander Smith, Principal Inspector of Taxes, Board of Inland Revenue.
- Ernest Smith, lately Registrar, University of Reading.
- Patricia Rosemary Smythe. For services to British Show Jumping.
- Arthur Southway, MM, Director, R. W. Crabtree & Sons Ltd., London.
- Henry George Sturgeon, Director and Chief Engineer, Ultra Electric Ltd., Acton.
- Richard William Sutton, Member of the Food Standards Committee.
- Francis Halford William Swallow. For political and public services in Grantham.
- Herbert Henry Swift, Chief Liaison Officer for National Savings, British Railways (South-Wales Area).
- Captain Edward John Syvret, Commodore Master, MV Port Auckland, Port Line Ltd.
- Arthur Henry Taylor, MBE, Principal Scientific Officer, Fuel Research Station, Department of Scientific & Industrial Research.
- Captain Charles William Taylor, DSC, RD. For political services in Greenock.
- Cyril Taylor, MBE, JP, Chairman, Coventry Local Employment Committee, Warwickshire.
- Richard Thompson, JP, Deputy Chairman, Durham Agricultural Executive Committee.
- Andrew Thomson, JP, General Manager, Savings Bank of Glasgow.
- Walter Charles Tricker, MBE, Registrar, Foreign Office.
- Sidney William Turner, MBE, Chairman, Coventry and Nuneaton War Pensions Committee, Warwickshire.
- Isidore Isaac Ungar, Deputy Director of Housing, London County Council.
- Vera Cecil Veitch, MB, ChB, Deputy Principal School Medical Officer, Stoke-on-Trent, Staffordshire.
- John Ricketts Vezey, Principal Scientific Officer, Coastal Command, Royal Air Force.
- Irwyn Ranald Walters, HM Inspector of Schools, Wales, Ministry of Education.
- George Edwin Warren, MBE, DL. For political services in County Fermanagh.
- Cyril John Webster, Honorary Secretary, Morpeth Borough Savings Committee.
- John Weir. For public services in the East End of London.
- William Douglas White, Assistant Regional Controller, Midlands Region, Ministry of Labour & National Service.
- James Whiteside, Clerk to the Justices for the City of Exeter.
- Alderman Vernon George Wilkinson, JP, Chairman, West Surrey District Advisory Committee of the London & South Eastern Regional Board for Industry.
- Charles Henry Williams, Head Postmaster, Liverpool.
- Francis George Willson, BEM, lately Assistant Director, Materials & Explosives Research & Development, Ministry of Supply.
- Herbert Ewart Winn, Principal, Stranmillis Training College, Belfast.
- Harry Vernon Witham, Higher Collector, Southampton, Board of Customs & Excise.
- Arthur William Wood, Clerk and Solicitor, Yorkshire Ouse River Board.
- Cyril Wood, lately Director, South Western Region, Arts Council of Great Britain.
- Arthur Joseph Woodall, Principal Lecturer, Royal Military College of Science, Wiltshire.
- Lieutenant-Colonel Clifford Stanley Woodward, JP, DL, Chairman, Bridgend Disablement Advisory Committee.
- James Candlish Young, Secretary, General Registry Office, Scotland.
- Hans Berman, Temporary Chief Executive Officer, British Information Services, Bonn.
- The Reverend Donald Blackburn, Church of England Chaplain in Amman.
- Charlie Alistair Britton, General Manager, Sudan Light & Power Co. Ltd.
- Geoffrey Clive Davies, lately British Consul at Honolulu.
- John Locke Irvine, British subject lately resident in Chile.
- James Lamb, MBE, First Secretary at Her Majesty's Embassy in Vienna.
- James Donald Lancaster, DSC, lately Second Secretary at Her Majesty's Embassy in Saigon.
- Albert James Martin, Trustee of the British Charitable Fund, Paris.
- The Venerable Archdeacon George Herbert Martin, Archdeacon of the Northern Sudan.
- Ralph Leslie Martin, British subject resident in Bolivia.
- Cecil Thomas Albert Nealon, Chief Mechanical Engineer, Ministry of Agriculture, Sudan Government.
- Edgar Emil Manicus Nielsen, First Secretary (Commercial) at Her Majesty's Embassy in Stockholm.
- Arthur Henry Noble, MBE, lately British Consul at San Juan, Puerto Rico.
- Cyril John Aloysius O'Kelly, FRCSI, LRCP, lately Surgeon at the Royal Hospital, Basra.
- Chantry Hamilton Page, MBE, lately Her Majesty's Consul at Port Said.
- Peter Anthony Ivan Tahourdin, Assistant British Council Representative in Yugoslavia.
- The Reverend Canon Bertram James Townsend, Church of England Chaplain in São Paulo.
- The Reverend Alexander John Boyd, Principal, Madras Christian College, India.
- The Venerable Archdeacon Arthur Leslie Bulbeck, of Adelaide, State of South Australia.
- George Herbert Challoner, Chairman, Salisbury Polytechnic School, Southern Rhodesia. For services to Education in the Federation of Rhodesia and Nyasaland.
- Cecil George Damant. For services to returned soldiers and their dependents in Basutoland.
- George James Dean, formerly Town Clerk, Melbourne City Council, State of Victoria.
- Leslie James Goddard, Rector of St. Paul's School, Darjeeling, India.
- The Reverend Robert Grinham. For services to Education in the Federation of Rhodesia and Nyasaland, particularly in Southern Rhodesia.
- Asher Alexander Joel. For services to social welfare and charitable organisations in the State of New South Wales.
- Frederick John Lovatt, Town Clerk of Salisbury, Southern Rhodesia.
- John MacIntyre. For services to Agriculture in the Federation of Rhodesia and Nyasaland.
- Lieutenant-Colonel Lachlan Moore McBean, ED, formerly Surveyor-General, Southern Rhodesia.
- Alexander Charles Parsons, JP, Warden of the Huon Municipality in the State of Tasmania.
- Jacobus Johannes Prinsloo, MBE, JP, a Member of the European Advisory Council, Swaziland, and President of the Southern Swaziland Farmers' Association.
- John Ritchie, Chairman of the United Kingdom Association (Punjab and North West Frontier Branch), Pakistan.
- Francis Farewell Roberts, Civil Commissioner and Magistrate, Bulawayo, Southern Rhodesia.
- John Edward Riley Roe, Director of Veterinary Services, Bechuanaland Protectorate.
- Harold John Steward, First Assistant Secretary, Government Secretariat, Mbabane, Swaziland.
- Frederick Storer, Honorary Secretary, Totally & Permanently Disabled Soldiers' Association, State of Victoria.
- The Reverend Gerard Kennedy Tucker, Superior of the Brotherhood of St Laurence in the State of Victoria.
- John Peter Richard Wallis. For public services to the Federation of Rhodesia and Nyasaland, especially in the editing of documents published by the Central African Archives.
- Daisy Ellen Rebecca Weeks, JP, a Councillor in the Shire of Alexandra, State of Victoria. For public services.
- Lawrence Napier Welch, formerly Senior Divisional Engineer, State Rivers and Water Supply Commission, State of Victoria.
- Leslie James Wilmoth, a Deputy Chairman of Council, The Royal Empire Society.
- Dudley Atherton Wilson, until recently Chairman of the Board of Trustees of the Joseph Fraser Memorial Nursing Home, Colombo, Ceylon.
- Herbert Hedley Woods, a Councillor of the North-East Riding of the Shire of Warracknabeal, State of Victoria, for nearly 40 years.
- The Right Reverend Monsignor Stephen Fagade Adewtjyi, Parish Priest, Ado, Egbado Division, Abeokuta Province, Western Region, Nigeria.
- James Otto Ajrd. For public services in Dominica, Windward Islands.
- The Reverend John Allen Angus. For services to Religious Education in Nigeria.
- Francis Anjo. For public services in Antigua, Leeward Islands.
- Vincent Apap. For services to Art in Malta.
- Norman Irving Archibald, MBE, Acting Deputy Director of Education, Nyasaland.
- Thillaiampalm Balasingham, Senior Lecturer in Pathology, University of Malaya.
- Francis Lodpwic Bartels. For services to Education in the Gold Coast.
- Hilary Alberic Maughn Beckles, Deputy Principal, Queen's College, British Guiana.
- Oliver Bosshardt Bennett. For public services in Northern Rhodesia.
- Henry Thomas Anthony Bowman, JP. For public services in British Honduras.
- Andrew Kerr Briant, Director of Education, Zanzibar.
- Owen Douglas Brisbane. For public services in St. Vincent, Windward Islands.
- William Muckle Bristow. For services to Education in the Northern Region, Nigeria.
- Gordon Priestley Burdett. For services to Agriculture in Northern Rhodesia.
- Frederick Barnaby Carter, Assistant Commissioner of Police, Cyprus.
- Warren Frederick Martin Clemens, MC, Senior Administrative Officer, Cyprus.
- Dennis Alfred Cornish, Government Printer, Northern Region, Nigeria.
- Grant Desbordes, Senior Accountant, Eastern Region, Nigeria.
- Cyril Lupius Duprey. For public services in Trinidad.
- George Edmond, City Engineer, City Council, Singapore.
- Rex Warren Ennis, Administrative Officer, Western Region, Nigeria.
- William Robert Forbes, Accountant General, Uganda.
- Horace Primrose Smith Gillette, MB, ChB, Superintendent Medical Officer (Specialist) Malariologist, Trinidad.
- Llewellyn Griffiths, Assistant Commissioner of Police, Kenya.
- Kenneth Page Hadingham, Senior Assistant Commissioner of Police, Kenya.
- Arthur John Inskip Hawkins, Lately Assistant Commissioner of Police, Northern Rhodesia.
- Harold Heys, Accountant-General, Nyasaland.
- James Kellock Hunter, MB, ChB, Deputy Director of Medical Services, Uganda.
- Vithal Krishna Josshi. For public services in Aden.
- John Harris Keast, Director of Surveys, Eastern Region, Nigeria.
- William Arnold Knight, Oversea Audit Service, Director of Audit, British Guiana.
- Xavier Koenig, Executive Engineer for Development & Welfare Works, Mauritius.
- Kofi George Konuah, Member, Public Service Commission, Gold Coast.
- George Macleod Levack, Administrative Officer, Gold Coast.
- Russell Elliott Lewars, Town Clerk, Kingston and St. Andrew Corporation, Jamaica.
- John Gordon Liverman. For services to the Volta River Project Preparatory Commission, Gold Coast.
- William Charles Donald Lovett, MD, BCh, Senior Medical Officer, Somaliland.
- James Mackay. For services to Agriculture in Kenya.
- Harry Miller, Assistant Editor, The Straits Times, Federation of Malaya.
- Donald Parker. For public services in Tanganyika.
- Kakubhai Kalidas Radia. For public services in Uganda.
- Hugh Aime Ragg, Director of Public Works, Fiji.
- Anthony Andrew Russo, LRCS, LRCP. For medical and public services in Gibraltar.
- Mallam Muhammadu Shehe, Emir of Argungu, Northern Region, Nigeria.
- Alexander Woodrow Stuart Sim, Assistant Comptroller of Customs, Federation of Malaya.
- Tan Kai Choon. For public services in Sarawak.
- Stuart Mathias Taylor, Director of Commerce and Industry, Sierra Leone.
- Charles Paxton Thompson, Administrative Officer, Federation of Nigeria.
- Eric James Thompson, Accountant-General, Tanganyika.
- George Gray Thomson, Public Relations Officer, Singapore.
- Captain Kenneth John Tomlin, MBE, Director of Public Works, Barbados.
- Hope Trant, MBE, MD, BCh. Lately Medical Research Officer, East African Medical Survey & Research Institute.
- William Frew Watson, Commissioner of Inland Revenue & Estate Duty, Hong Kong.
- Arthur Thomas Wedgwood. For public services in Sarawak.
- Stuart Ireland White, Deputy Chief Engineer, Mechanical Engineering Department, Office of the Crown Agents for Oversea Governments & Administrations.
- Mohammed Yassin bin Haji Hashim, MBE, Member of the Executive Council, North Borneo.

Honorary Officers

- See Khoon Lim. For public services in Perak, Federation of Malaya.
- Haji Che Ahmad bin Ismail, JP. For public services in Kelantan, Federation of Malaya.

==== Member of the Order of the British Empire (MBE) ====
Military Division

Royal Navy

- Lieutenant-Commander (E) Henry Seymour Bromby, (Retd.)
- Senior Commissioned Engineer Gordon Leslie Bruty.
- Recruiting Officer Frederick Chadwick, Royal Marines.
- Lieutenant-Commander Allan Healey.
- First Officer Beatrice Marjorie Hooppell, Women's Royal Naval Service.
- Lieutenant Ronald Leonard, DFC.
- Lieutenant Richard Roberts Frederick Liddall, (Retd.)
- Temporary Senior Commissioned Boatswain John George Passey, (Retd.)
- Surgeon Lieutenant-Commander John Stuart Pepys Rawlins, BM, BCh.
- Senior Commissioned Catering Officer William Sydney Gaius Tanner.
- Captain John Aubrey Taplin, Royal Marines.
- Temporary Acting Commissioned Engineer William Clifford James Williams, (on loan to the Government of India).
- Temporary Lieutenant-Commander (Sp.) Leon Harold Willson, MC, RNVR.

Army

- Major (temporary) Andrew Ainslie (117417), The Royal Scots (The Royal Regiment) (AOER.) (Re-employed).
- Major Winifred Mary Backhouse, TD (192381), Women's Royal Army Corps.
- Major Charles Norman Barker, MC (95654), The Gordon Highlanders.
- 14942005 Warrant Officer Class II Colin Islwyn Barnes, Intelligence Corps.
- Major (temporary) William Gerald Hugh Beach, MC (251023), Corps of Royal Engineers.
- 879467 Warrant Officer Class II Andrew Beattie, Royal Regiment of Artillery, Territorial Army.
- Major (Quartermaster) John Hubert Bradbury, TD (91393) Royal Regiment of Artillery (now Retd.)
- Major (acting) Philip Brocklesby, 43rd West Riding Battalion, Home Guard.
- Captain (Director of Music) Lewis Doyle Brown (384328) Royal Army Medical Corps.
- Major (now Lieutenant-Colonel) (Technical Officer, Telecommunications) Holroyd Ernest Hugh Clements (105592), Royal Corps of Signals.
- 22292964 Warrant Officer Class II Joseph Charles Beresford Coldicott, Royal Army Ordnance Corps.
- 22531083 Warrant Officer Class II Eric Gordon Lennox Craik, The Seaforth Highlanders (Ross-shire Buffs, The Duke of Albany's).
- Captain (Quartermaster) Herbert Samuel Dafforn (353960), Royal Regiment of Artillery.
- Major (Quartermaster) Edward Reginald Davidson (248924), Royal Army Service Corps (nowRetd.)
- Captain (QGO) Dhanbahadur Gurung, MC. (388456), 6th Gurkha Rifles.
- 1871328 Warrant Officer Class I Harold Emment, Corps of Royal Engineers.
- 22294439 Warrant Officer Class I (Bandmaster) Charles Sydney Evans, The South Staffordshire Regiment, Territorial Army.
- Major (acting) James Lawrence Evans (304612), Corps of Royal Engineers, Territorial Army.
- 2042659 Warrant Officer Class II James Herbert Faizey, Corps of Royal Engineers, Territorial Army.
- Major (acting) Kenneth Flin, 57th Kent Battalion, Home Guard.
- Major (acting) Leonard Miller Frazer, South Antrim Battalion, Home Guard.
- Major (acting) Edward George Gardner, 5th Dorset Battalion, Home Guard.
- 812419 Warrant Officer Class I John Owen Gifford, Royal Regiment of Artillery.
- Captain Charles Edward Godbold (279378), General List (Section A), Territorial Army, Adjutant-Quartermaster, 3rd Shropshire Battalion, Home Guard (now Retd.)
- 1466230 Warrant Officer Class II Ewell Frederick Green, Royal Regiment of Artillery, Territorial Army.
- Major (temporary) John Alan Griffiths (201484), Royal Army Ordnance Corps.
- 6347103 Warrant Officer Class II John England Grubb, The Queen's Own Royal West Kent Regiment.
- Major Michael Guy Harris (129750), Royal Regiment of Artillery.
- Major William Clare Harrison (232045), Royal Army Ordnance Corps.
- Major Anne Mary Hine-Haycock (244885), Women's Royal Army Corps, Territorial Army.
- W/11074 Warrant Officer Class I Alys Hillyard, Women's Royal Army Corps.
- Major Mervyn Ingledew Hore (235880), Corps of Royal Military Police.
- Captain (Quartermaster) George Nelson Howe (415867), Irish Guards.
- 828265 Warrant Officer Class I William Edward Jaine, Royal Regiment of Artillery.
- Major William Geoffrey Juckes, TD (74799). The Royal Hampshire Regiment, Territorial Army.
- Major Leo William Karn (121061), The Queen's Royal Regiment (West Surrey).
- Major Travers Richard King (322284), The Royal Ulster Rifles (Employed List (4)).
- 558174 Warrant Officer Class II Harold Lamb, Royal Armoured Corps, Territorial Army.
- Major Frederick Jacques Leon Lang, TD, FRCS, LRCP (37420), Royal Army Medical Corps, Territorial Army.
- Major Reginald Hume Last (120532), The Middlesex Regiment (Duke of Cambridge's Own) (Employed List (4)).
- 1667137 Warrant Officer Class II William Thomas Lee, Royal Regiment of Artillery, Territorial Army.
- Major (Quartermaster) Harry Cornelius Loveridge (137401), Army Catering Corps.
- Major (Quartermaster) Charles James Lusher (211703), Royal Armoured Corps (Employed List (4)).
- 3185339 Warrant Officer Class II John Norman Lyall, The King's Own Scottish Borderers, Territorial Army.
- Major (acting) Ralph Fielding Maughan, 7th North Riding Battalion, Home Guard.
- Major Thomas Bellingham Smith McMain (240820), Royal Corps of Signals, Territorial Army.
- Captain Robert Maurice Merrell (277516), Corps of Royal Engineers.
- Captain (acting) William Henry Milsom (181809), Army Cadet Force.
- Major Philip Clive Mitford (74693), The Seaforth Highlanders (Ross-shire Buffs, The Duke of Albany's).
- 21015349 Warrant Officer Class II Alma Rufus Moore, Special Air Service Regiment, Territorial Army.
- Lieutenant James Sidney Nobbs (412026), Corps of Royal Engineers.
- Captain Mary Noonan (386120), Queen Alexandra's Royal Army Nursing Corps.
- Major (acting) Maurice Norton (283961), Combined Cadet Force.
- Major Archibald William Nutt (113261), Royal Army Service Corps (Employed List (4)).
- Major Brian Harold John Anthony O'Reilly (112902), Royal Army Service Corps.
- 2718568 Warrant Officer Class I Walter Pestell, The Parachute Regiment.
- Major (temporary) Fred Raine (359150), Corps of Royal Engineers.
- Captain William Arthur Daniel Ranger (350603), General List (Section A), Territorial Army, Adjutant-Quartermaster, 21st Sussex Battalion, Home Guard.
- Captain (acting) Percival Douglas Read, 14th Hampshire Battalion, Home Guard.
- Major (Quartermaster) William Christopher Roberts (238506), Royal Regiment of Artillery (Employed List (4)), seconded to Officers' Training Corps.
- Major (Quartermaster) Christopher John Robinson (167474), The East Yorkshire Regiment (The Duke of York's Own).
- 2216942 Warrant Officer Class I Robert Roy, DCM, The Black Watch (Royal Highland Regiment).
- W/111976 Warrant Officer Class II Olive Annie Rutter, Women's Royal Army Corps.
- 7882551 Warrant Officer Class II Harold Smith, Royal Armoured Corps, Territorial Army.
- Captain Alfred Edward Solly (6901), General List (Section A), Territorial Army, lately Adjutant-Quartermaster, Armagh Battalion, Home Guard (now Retd.)
- Captain (Quartermaster) Arthur James Spratley, MM (405735), Grenadier Guards.
- Major (temporary) Alan Norman Stacey (233619), Corps of Royal Engineers.
- Major (now Lieutenant-Colonel) (acting) Frederick Kenneth Theobald, TD (52188), Army Cadet Force.
- Major Hardress Jocelyn De Warrenne Waller, MC (71010), Royal Regiment of Artillery.
- 318813 Warrant Officer Class II Stephen Wardrope, Corps of Royal Electrical & Mechanical Engineers.
- 22513907 Warrant Officer Class II Stephen Lea Webb, Intelligence Corps, Territorial Army.
- Major (acting) (Honorary Lieutenant-Colonel) Berend George Wennink, TD (66276), Combined Cadet Force (now Retd.)
- Major George Widdowson, TD (49397), Corps of Royal Engineers, Territorial Army.
- Captain Thomas Henry Wilkinson (406750), Corps of Royal Engineers, Territorial Army.
- 11269804 Warrant Officer Class II Robert Wright, The Parachute Regiment. Territorial Army.
- Major (temporary) Bernard David Morgan (355652), Corps of Royal Electrical & Mechanical Engineers; at present on loan to the Government of India.
- Captain Cyril Austin Taylor, Commanding Officer, Montserrat Defence Force.

In recognition of services in Korea during the period 28 July 1955 to 31 January 1956

- Major John Charles Chase (194755), Royal Army Service Corps.

Royal Air Force

- Squadron Leader Nathaniel Bangs (48461), (Retd.)
- Squadron Leader William Hubert James Daw (43679).
- Squadron Leader Leslie Ewart Farrell (45013).
- Squadron Leader Basil Robert William Forster, DFC, AFC (124611).
- Squadron Leader James Allen Boyed Mounsey, MRCS, LRCP (202837).
- Acting Squadron Leader Roy Thomas Cahill (129067).
- Acting Squadron Leader Robert Kenworthy (129866), Royal Air Force Volunteer Reserve (Training Branch).
- Flight Lieutenant Arthur Adamson (59956).
- Flight Lieutenant David Stevenson Dolbear (565507).
- Flight Lieutenant Leslie Herbert Cyril Gayfer, DFM (47082).
- Flight Lieutenant Herbert Edward Green (50679).
- Flight Lieutenant Peter Trevor Hall (198721).
- Flight Lieutenant Hector Ernest Hammett (54917).
- Flight Lieutenant Edmund Courtney Henderson (58393).
- Flight Lieutenant Thomas James Howard (58445).
- Flight Lieutenant Henry John King (49237).
- Flight Lieutenant Frank Moses Noel Lewis (57300).
- Flight Lieutenant John Anthony Louis (571747).
- Flight Lieutenant Thomas Lancaster Milner (169057).
- Flight Lieutenant Raymond Frederick Pearson (55135).
- Flight Lieutenant William John Thomas Smith, AFC (45189).
- Flight Lieutenant Harry Staples (52630).
- Flight Lieutenant James Swainston (59033).
- Flight Lieutenant William Robert Watts (58805).
- Flight Lieutenant Harold Webb (59227).
- Acting Flight Lieutenant Leslie Arthur Montgomery (203565), Royal Air Force Volunteer Reserve (Training Branch).
- Warrant Officer Alfred Ayres (2686005), Royal Auxiliary Air Force.
- Warrant Officer Douglas John Arthur Brooke-Webb (509568).
- Warrant Officer Joseph Edward Butcher (356545).
- Warrant Officer Thomas William Catton (550233).
- Warrant Officer Bernard Vickers Cooper (563075).
- Warrant Officer Edwin Richard Fountain (630116).
- Warrant Officer Lancelot Ingledew Harvey (359841).
- Warrant Officer Cyril Leslie Hickling (551120).
- Warrant Officer Alfred Robert Jukes (348792).
- Warrant Officer Thomas Lillie (517452).
- Warrant Officer Walter Denis Macgregor (531148).
- Warrant Officer Charles Joseph Mansford (364921).
- Warrant Officer Isaac Redpath (639302).
- Warrant Officer Roger Sandford (633027).
- Warrant Officer Frederick Charles Thomas (512934).
- Warrant Officer Thomas William Thurston (565034).
- Warrant Officer Alexander Paterson Walker (540585).
- Warrant Officer Class I Carlos Alberto de Jesus Vieira Ribeiro, Hong Kong Auxiliary Air Force.
- Acting Warrant Officer Alfred Harold Burkey (528069).
- Acting Warrant Officer Leslie George Ward (611045).
- Squadron Leader Francis Eustace Edmund Truscott (49714), Royal Air Force; at present on loan to the Government of Pakistan.

Civil Division

- William David Mabon Abraham, Commissioner and Brigade Secretary, St. John Ambulance Brigade, Priory for Wales of the Order of St. John.
- James Arthur Aked, Transmission Engineer, South of Scotland Electricity Board.
- Charles Allen, Higher Executive Officer, Home Office.
- Margaret Annie Allin, Matron, Naburn and Bootham Park Hospital, York.
- Alderman John William Allot. For public services in Swadlincote, Derbyshire.
- Horace George Amer, Area Livestock Inspector, Ministry of Agriculture, Fisheries & Food.
- Mary Anderson. For public services in Northumberland.
- Frederick Gray Arklie, Chairman, Aberdeen Fish Curers' and Merchants' Association.
- Edith Betty Armitage. For political and public services in Berkshire.
- George Henry Baggott, Higher Executive Officer, Ministry of Pensions & National Insurance.
- James Balfour, JP, Honorary Secretary, Joint Industrial Advisory Council for Scottish Institutions for the Blind.
- William Arthur Ball, Manager of Decorating Department, Ashby & Homer Ltd., Builders.
- Leonard Harker Barton, Senior Technical Officer, Ministry of Health.
- Albert Edward Basford. For political and public services in Hayes and Harlington.
- Charles Cecil Birch, Higher Executive Officer, Export Credits Guarantee Department.
- William Blenkin, Superintendent, Durham County Constabulary.
- Elsie Blest. For political and public services in Sevenoaks.
- Henry James Blighton. For political services.
- David Bogie, Chief Engineer, MV Soochow, China Navigation Co. Ltd.
- Doris Flora Bore. For political and public services in Staffordshire.
- Alice Maud Boutell, Higher Executive Officer Board of Trade.
- Edward Bowles, Works Manager, Churchill Components (Coventry) Ltd., Market Bosworth, near Nuneaton.
- Alderman William Boyson, JP, Chairman, Haslingden Local Employment Committee, Lancashire.
- John Basil Brennan, General Secretary, Institution of Chemical Engineers.
- Edward Vincent Locke Briggs, Staff Officer, Ministry of Commerce, Northern Ireland.
- Ashley James Brown, Senior Inspector, Inspectorate of Clothing, Ministry of Supply.
- Florence Jane Brown, JP, Member, Abertillery Urban District Council.
- Glenvina Winnibel Brown, Clerk, Grade 1, Ordnance Services, Caribbean Area, War Office.
- Captain Herbert Arthur Brown, JP. For public services in Nottinghamshire.
- Sarah Buckley, JP. For political and public services in Blackburn.
- Violet Marshall Burdett, Mental Health Officer, Ipswich County Borough.
- Harry Frost Burrell, lately Manager, General Engineering Department, Vickers-Armstrongs Ltd., Barrow-in-Furness.
- Stanley Ebenezer Burrows, Market Superintendent, Covent Garden Properties Co. Ltd.
- May Campbell, Honorary Secretary, Belfast Musical Festival.
- Horace Reginald Canning, Manager, Marine Department, British Thomson-Houston Co. Ltd., Rugby.
- Haim Manuel Cansino, Honorary Secretary, Council for the Tercentenary of the Resettlement of the Jews in the British Isles.
- George Lawrence Cardwell, Chief Die Designer, Drop Forge Department, English Steel Forge & Engineering Corporation Ltd.
- Harry Alfred Carter, Temporary Assistant, Foreign Office.
- Catherine Grace Catley, Senior Executive Officer, Ministry of Transport & Civil Aviation.
- Wilbert John Clapham, Engineer II, Directorate of Engine Production, Ministry of Supply.
- Norman Clark, General Manager, Wessex Trustee Savings Bank.
- James Arthur Cole, Chief Superintendent, Metropolitan Police Force.
- John Marriott Cole, Lately Principal Clerk, Supreme Court Taxing Office.
- David Reid Colquhoun, Purser and Chief Steward, SS City of Port Elizabeth, Ellerman Lines Ltd.
- James Goudie Colville, Assistant Shipyard Manager, Harland & Wolff Ltd., Belfast.
- Irene Helen Combs, Vice-President and Honorary Treasurer, "The Watch Ashore". For services to the Merchant Navy.
- Henry Coward, Generation Engineer (Operation), North West, Merseyside & North Wales Division, Central Electricity Authority.
- Harold Charles Cowie, Deputy Chief Officer, Berkshire & Reading Fire Brigade.
- Lawrence John Cox, Station Master, Waterloo, Southern Region, British Railways, British Transport Commission.
- Harry Pollard Crabtree, Senior Coaching Adviser, Marylebone Cricket Club Youth Cricket Association.
- James Argo Craig, Senior Experimental Officer, Admiralty.
- Oswald Pilkington Cronshaw, North Wales Grid Manager and Chairman, Clwyd and Deeside Group, Wales Gas Board.
- Alfred Charles Croot, Superintendent and Deputy Chief Constable, Huntingdonshire Constabulary.
- George Francis Coleman-Cross, Toc H Commissioner, Middle East.
- William Henry Grossman, BEM, JP, Chairman of Committee, No. 406 (Willesden) and No. 1906 (Neasden) Squadrons, Air Training Corps.
- James Crowther, Chief Metallurgist, James Booth & Co. Ltd., Birmingham.
- Henry Edward Middleton Cushing, lately Executive Officer, Northern Ireland District, War Office.
- Mildred Mary Stevens Darvell, Superintendent of Typists, Board of Trade.
- Evan Davies, JP, Member, Cardiganshire Smallholdings Committee.
- Albert Leslie Dawson, Civil Defence Officer, Sheffield.
- Cyril Herbert Dee, Higher Executive Officer, Ministry of Agriculture, Fisheries & Food.
- Frank Dew, Higher Executive Officer, Ministry of Supply.
- John Dickie, Chief Engineer, SS Baron Elgin, H. Hogarth & Sons Ltd.
- Elizabeth Nicholas Dickson, JP. For political and public services in Perthshire.
- Leslie Reginald Dougal, Deputy Sales Manager, London, British European Airways.
- Robert Jackson Dowding, Burgh Surveyor, Chief Sanitary Inspector, Burgh Engineer and Manager of Works Department, Denny and Dunipace, Lanarkshire.
- Charles Henry, Herbert Drain Inspector of Taxes, Board of Inland Revenue.
- Elsie Jean Duffy, Headmistress, Margaret Barclay Residential School for Physically Handicapped Children, Mobberley, Cheshire.
- Mary Edna Dunne, Intelligence Officer, Grade I, Joint Intelligence Bureau, Ministry of Defence.
- Ernest Alfred Dutton, Higher Executive Officer, War Office.
- Colin Ecclestone, Honorary Treasurer, Forces Help Society and Lord Roberts Workshops, north Staffordshire.
- Annie Evelyn Edwards. For charitable work in the Isle of Man.
- David Richard Edwards, JP. For philanthropic services in Wales.
- Thomas Edwards, Manager, Flint Employment Exchange, Ministry of Labour & National Service.
- Roy Gilbert Ellen, Performance Control Engineer, Standard Telephones and Cables Ltd., North Woolwich.
- Hubert Alexander Malcolm Ellsley, Senior Executive Officer, Board of Trade.
- Leonard Sidgwick Elton, MC, Regional Officer, Commonwealth Department, British Council.
- William Thomas Emery, Member, Lincoln Local Employment Committee and Disablement Advisory Committee.
- John Noel Evans, Manager, Mountstuart Dry Dock Co. Ltd., Avonmouth.
- Constance Everett, Higher Executive Officer, Ministry of Works.
- Robert Leonard Fagg, Assistant Engineer, Telephone Manager's Office, Tunbridge Wells, General Post Office.
- Edwin Faraday, Chief Supply Official, Navy, Army & Air Force Institutes, Egypt.
- Joseph Edward Farrell, Engineering Assistant, Office of the Receiver for the Metropolitan Police District.
- Brigadier Richard Hugh Farren. For political and public services in Hastings and St. Leonards.
- Clifford-Henry George Filer, Executive Officer, War Office.
- Archibald Fletcher, Principal Sheriff Clerk Depute of Renfrewshire at Greenock.
- Thomas James Flint, Higher Executive Officer, Air Ministry.
- Euphemia Mowat Beith Forrest, Member, Scottish Savings Committee and Lanarkshire Local Savings Committee.
- John Archibald Forrest, Principal Senior Lecturer, Birmingham College of Technology.
- Fred Fowler, Headmaster, Thorne Moorends County Junior School near Doncaster.
- Alexander James Frame, Assistant Chief Officer, Hertfordshire Fire Brigade.
- Edward Freedman, Senior Executive Officer, Ministry of Pensions & National Insurance, Manchester.
- John Galbraith, Executive Officer, Board of Customs & Excise.
- Mary Henrietta Stranack Gaskell, Assistant County Director, Glamorgan, British Red Cross Society.
- Sidney Harry George, Staff Officer, Board of Inland Revenue.
- Arthur Gibbons, Higher Executive Officer, Building Research Station, Department of Scientific & Industrial Research.
- Elizabeth Gray Gibson. For political services in Edinburgh.
- Dorothy Frances Sutherland Gill, Secretary of the Croydon Guild of Social Service.
- William Gill, Inspector of Taxes (Higher Grade), Board of Inland Revenue.
- Frances Isabel Gillett. For political and public services in the West Riding of Yorkshire.
- James Alexander Gilliland, Shipyard Manager, Cammell Laird & Co. Ltd., Birkenhead.
- Robert Gilmour, Chairman, Hospital Auxiliary Committee, Southern General Hospital, Glasgow.
- Frederick Walter Goodchild, Accountant and Secretary, National Institute of Houseworkers.
- Violet Eiffel Goodwin, Member, Dewsbury Local Employment Committee.
- Gordon Sutherland Grant, Air Traffic Control Officer in Charge, Kirkwall Aerodrome, Ministry of Transport & Civil Aviation.
- Captain Ian Crawford Grant, General Manager, Scottish Airlines Ltd.
- Elsie Ellen Greenaway, Secretary, National Association of Glove Manufacturers, London.
- Albert Wolsey Hale, Senior Executive Officer, Ministry of Pensions & National Insurance.
- Katharine Winnie Hammett, Headmistress, All Saints Church of England Junior School, Isle of Wight.
- Leslie Hampton, Senior Executive Officer, Ministry of Pensions & National Insurance.
- Ebenezer Hancox, District Officer, HM Coastguard, Ministry of Transport & Civil Aviation.
- Beatrice Mary Handcock, County Borough Organiser, Wolverhampton, Women's Voluntary Services.
- Alderman Tom Llewellyn Harries, JP, Chairman, Carmarthen West District Committee, Carmarthenshire Agricultural Executive Committee.
- William Joseph Harris, Secretary, Sir James Laing & Sons Ltd., Sunderland.
- Robert John Hayes, Senior Executive Officer, Board of Trade.
- Herbert Charles Hayward, Chairman, Colchester District Committee, Essex Agricultural Executive Committee.
- Anstice Saffery Heath, Higher Executive Officer, Ministry of Education.
- John Gunn Henderson, Senior Accountant, Scottish Home Department.
- Sarah Frances Heron, Honorary Secretary, Belfast Girls' Club.
- Alderman Isabella Heys, JP. For political and public services in Lancashire.
- Thomas William Higgins, Higher Executive Officer, Commonwealth Relations Office.
- Kenneth Gordon Hill, Senior Executive Officer, Ministry of Education.
- Gerald Hinds, Chief Officer, Norwich Fire Brigade.
- Edith Kate Hartly-Hodder. For political and public services in Bristol.
- Robert Dennis Hogg, Horticultural Officer, North West European District, Imperial War Graves Commission.
- Sidney Patrick Holland, Departmental Civilian Officer, Malta, War Office.
- Mary Horan, Senior Executive Officer, Ministry of Pensions & National Insurance.
- William Arthur House, Regional Collector of Taxes, Board of Inland Revenue.
- Frederick Standen Howell, Secretary and Registrar, Forth District, The Shipping Federation Ltd.
- Reginald Victor Howell, General Secretary, Empire Rheumatism Council.
- William Reeves Humphrey, District Secretary, Transport & General Workers' Union.
- Bertram Robert Humphreys, lately Secretary, Indian Seamen's Committee & Manager, Crew Department, Gray, Dawes & Co. Ltd.
- Captain Walter Frederick Hunter, MC. For political services in Northern Ireland.
- Cecil Thomas Ladbrook Hurley, JP. For political and public services in North Somerset.
- Joseph Grey Hutton Manager, Melville Hall Estate, Dominica, Windward Islands.
- Lena Mabel Innes, Sister-in-Charge, Out Patient Department, Royal Hospital for Sick Children, Edinburgh.
- James Herbertson Jackman, Higher Executive Officer, Ministry of Pensions & National Insurance.
- Alexander Jamieson, Group Manager, Western Group, Scottish Gas Board.
- Kenneth Edmund Brian Jay, Principal Scientific Officer, Scientific Administration Division, Atomic Energy Research Establishment.
- Wilfrid Harry Jenkins, Higher Clerical Officer, Trinity House.
- John Henry John, Senior Executive Officer, Ministry of Pensions & National Insurance.
- Doris May Johnson, Executive Officer, Ministry of Housing & Local Government.
- Matthew Johnson. For political and public services in Wallsend.
- Maud Jessie Johnson, JP, Divisional Director, British Red Cross Society, Great Yarmouth.
- Charles Walter Johnstone, BEM, lately Engineer Technical I, Royal Aircraft Establishment, Farnborough, Ministry of Supply.
- John Allen Rowlatt-Jones, Chief Technician, Martin-Baker Aircraft Co. Ltd., Denham, Buckinghamshire.
- Mary Ann Jones. For political and public services in Derby.
- Alfred Kelly, lately Superintendent and Deputy Chief Constable, Isle of Man Constabulary.
- William John Moffett Kennedy, lately Senior Committee Clerk, Belfast Corporation.
- Arthur Edwin Kent, Senior Executive Officer, National Assistance Board.
- Annie Alice Flutter Key. For political and public services in Hornchurch.
- Martin Killin, Clerical Officer, Ministry of Works.
- Ralph Stewart Kinnaird, Clerk, Grade 2, Foreign Office. Lately Queen's Foreign Service Messenger.
- Stanley Ewart Kippax, Member, Lancashire Agricultural Executive Committee.
- Arthur John Kurn, Chief Photographer, Central Office of Information.
- Marie Ford Laidlaw. For political services in the West of Scotland.
- Lizzie Julia Barton Land, County Secretary, Staffordshire Association for the Welfare of the Blind.
- Henry Richard Lane, Chief Engineer, Southdown Motor Services Ltd.
- James Phillips Lanyon, Senior Executive Officer, Ministry of Fuel & Power.
- Albert George Jasper Latoy, Chief Steward, SS Andes, Royal Mail Lines Ltd.
- Frederick Lee, BEM, Inspector of Works, Royal Air Force, Martlesham Heath, Suffolk.
- Edwin Lees, District Traffic Superintendent, Ayr, Scottish Region, British Railways, British Transport Commission.
- Alfred William Lennard, Chairman, Sussex War Pensions Committee.
- Ethel Lewis, Grade 3 Officer, Branch B of the Foreign Service, Foreign Office.
- Morgan James Lewis, Chief Clerk, University of Cambridge Officers Training Corps (Territorial Army).
- Ernest Linington, Chief Clerk, County of Sussex Territorial & Auxiliary Forces Association.
- Charles William Edward Litchfield, lately Senior Executive Officer, Board of Trade.
- Frederick Guthrie Lobb, Senior Executive Officer, Savings Department, General Post Office.
- Frank Berti Lydall, Chairman, Dewsbury, Batley, Wakefield and Mirfield District Advisory Committee of the East and West Ridings Regional Board for Industry.
- Dorothy Sarah Lyndsay, Honorary Secretary and Collector, School Savings Group, Model School, Londonderry.
- Jean Babington Macaulay, Home Nurse, Essex County Council.
- Iris MacDermott, Chairman, Lambeth Streets Savings Committee.
- Isabel Macdonald, Secretary, Royal British Nurses Association.
- Harold Gilmore Mace, Regional Chief Executive Officer, Northern Region, Ministry of Fuel & Power.
- James McFetridge, JP, District Commandant, Ulster Special Constabulary.
- Kathleen Philomena McGreevy, Ward Sister, Kent County Ophthalmic and Aural Hospital, Maidstone.
- John Alexander Furnivall MacKean, Senior Executive Officer, Ministry of Transport & Civil Aviation.
- Christina Mackenzie, JP, Warden, Atholl House Mother and Baby Hostel, Glasgow.
- Jessica Moffat Rankin Maclean, Grade 3 Officer, Ministry of Labour & National Service.
- Angus MacLeod, Agricultural Adviser for Lewis and Harris, North of Scotland College of Agriculture.
- Clementina Ferguslie McQuaker, Senior Executive Officer, Foreign Office.
- Alfred Madle. For political and public services in Middlesex.
- Richard Edward Manly, Air Traffic Control Officer II, London Airport.
- Benjamin William Manning. For political and public services in Suffolk.
- Margaret May Marpole, Home Nurse, Llanelly, South Wales.
- Alderman Harold Rupert Marshall, Chairman, Birmingham Disablement Advisory Committee.
- Lieutenant-Colonel William Norman Marshall, MC, TD, lately Civil Defence Officer, West Midlands Gas Board; now Civil Defence Officer, Staffordshire County Council.
- Percy Martin, Higher Executive Officer, Ministry of Health.
- Roy William Ferrier-May, Senior Executive Officer, Ministry of Transport & Civil Aviation.
- Hilda Meadows, Higher Executive Officer, Admiralty.
- Agnes Henderson Meldrum, Secretary, National Art Collections Fund.
- Alexander Wilson Menzies, Process Development Manager, Sir W. G. Armstrong Whitworth Aircraft Ltd., Coventry.
- Gertrude Mary Miller, Assistant, Home Presentation Department, British Broadcasting Corporation.
- Mabel Agatha Moorhouse, lately Ward Sister, Netherne Hospital, Coulsdon, Surrey.
- Stanley Morton, JP, Member, Bucklow Rural District Council, Cheshire.
- George Wyville Moses. For services as Honorary Secretary, Hemsworth Savings Committee, West Riding of Yorkshire.
- Amy Mary Musther, Tutor to Houseparent Courses, Home Office Central Training Council.
- Frank Stephen Newborn, JP. For political and public services in the West Riding of Yorkshire.
- William Harold Newsome, Senior Executive Officer, Ministry of Agriculture, Fisheries & Food.
- Grace Elliott Nicholson, lately Head Almoner, United Newcastle upon Tyne Hospitals.
- Gerald Nixon, Executive Engineer, Telephone Manager's Office, Coventry, General Post Office.
- Wilfred Ivor Maxwell Nixon, Senior Executive Officer, Ministry of Pensions & National Insurance.
- Wing Commander Edward William Norris, Chief Divisional Organiser, Royal Society for the Prevention of Accidents.
- William Edward Norwood, Assistant Fire Service Inspector, Home Office.
- Charles Patrick Oakshott, Senior Executive Officer, No. 4 Maintenance Unit, Royal Air Force, Ruislip.
- Mervyn Cecil Oliver, Calligrapher.
- Dudley Ronald Edward O'Neill, Technical Sales Manager, The London Aluminium Co. Ltd., Birmingham.
- John Griffith Owen, Committee Land Agent, Anglesey Agricultural Executive Committee.
- Gerald Stanley Palmer, Manager, Titanium Melting Plant, William Jessop & Sons Ltd.
- Wing-Commander William Richard Parkhouse, Managing Director, Exeter Airport Ltd. For services to civil aviation.
- Jessie Hamilton Paxton, Honorary Superintendent, Methil Nursery School, Fife.
- Arthur William Payne, Higher Executive Officer, General Post Office.
- Dora Lilian Pearce, Centre Organiser, Hove, Women's Voluntary Services.
- Dorothy Caroline Pearce, Grade 3 officer, Ministry of Labour & National Service.
- Harold Leslie Pease, Works Surveyor, Imperial War Graves Commission.
- James Pedley, Secretary, Plymouth Local Productivity Committee, Transport & General Workers' Union.
- Francis Alexander Peters, Senior Executive Officer, War Office.
- Major William Pettigrew, MC, JP, Secretary, South Western Division, Earl Haig Fund.
- Reginald Vernon Phillips, Deputy Commissioner, South Eastern Region, National Savings Committee.
- Daisy Clarissa Plummer, General Secretary, National Children Adoption Association.
- Charles Edward Pooley, Senior Executive Officer, Colonial Office.
- Hilda Ivy Port, Headmistress, Oakwood Church of England Primary School.
- Martha Potts, Head Teacher, High Southwick Primary Girls' School, Sunderland.
- Wilfred Poulsom, TD, Manager, Newcastle Employment Exchange, Ministry of Labour & National Service.
- Leonard John Quelch, Superintendent and Deputy Chief Constable, Oxford City Police Force.
- Alfred Radford, Superintending Inspector, Aeronautical Inspection Service, No. 7. Maintenance Unit, Royal Air Force, Quedgeley.
- Charles Travell Read, Borough Engineer and Surveyor, Maidenhead.
- Frederick Charles Read, BEM, Manager, Ordnance Board Printing Press, Ministry of Supply.
- David Graham Reavey Dock Engineer Manager, John Brown & Co. (Clydebank) Ltd., Clydebank.
- Francis David Rees, MM, Higher Executive Officer, Ministry of Housing & Local Government.
- George Scouller Munn Rhodes, City Factor, Perth.
- Ernest Albert Richards, Inspecting Officer of Shipfitting Work, Admiralty.
- Lorna Marion Ridgway, Headmistress, William Forster County Junior Mixed and Infants' School, Islington.
- Ronald Ernest Ridgwell, Headquarters Superintendent and Chief Instructor, Civil Defence Training, London Ambulance Service.
- James Robert Rimmer, JP, Chairman, Formby Urban District Council.
- William George Risbridger, Higher Executive Officer, School of Military Engineering, War Office.
- Griffith Thomas Roberts, Member, representing Caernarvonshire, National Savings Assembly.
- Herbert Robinson, Horticulturist, Hinckley, Leicestershire.
- Mary Elizabeth Robinson, Senior Executive Officer, Board of Customs & Excise.
- Robert John Roddick, Inspector of Taxes, Board of Inland Revenue.
- Anne Kyle Roe. For public services in Londonderry.
- Sarah Jane Rowland. For political and public services in Barry.
- Andrew Sinclair Roxburgh, JP, Master of Works, Gourock Ropework Co. Ltd.
- John Rue, Senior Executive Officer, Air Ministry.
- William George Tilden Russell, Manager, Motor Transport Department, National Benzole Co. Ltd.
- Norman Amos, Sales Second Secretary, Office of the High Commissioner for the United Kingdom, Ottawa.
- Kathleen May Sanders, Senior Telecommunications Superintendent, Headquarters Inland Telecommunications Department, General Post Office.
- Evelyn Frances Savill. For political and public services in Caterham.
- Gwendolen Maude Saye. For services to welfare organisations in Bournemouth.
- Arthur Turner Scarisbrick, Officer, Belfast, Board of Customs & Excise.
- Elsie Winifred Scott, Headmistress, Huntingdon County Primary School.
- William Scott, MB, ChB, Admiralty Surgeon and Agent and Medical Officer, Royal Naval Torpedo Factory, Alexandria, Dumbartonshire.
- Robert Humphry Sears, Honorary Secretary, Soldiers' Sailors' & Airmen's Families Association, New Forest Division.
- Arthur Harold Selby, Production Manager, George W. King Ltd., Stevenage.
- John Senior, Member, Northern Regional Board for Industry.
- Alfred Shaw, Battery Division Sales Manager, Crompton Parkinson Ltd., Aldwych.
- Charles Henry Shaw, Chief Cashier, Imperial Chemical Industries Ltd., Wilton Works, Middlesbrough.
- James Lymburn Shaw, District Officer, Grade I, Forestry Commission.
- John Bailey Shelton, City Chamberlain, Coventry, Warwickshire.
- Wilfred George Short, Colliery Manager, Crumlin Navigation and Aberbeeg South Collieries, South Western Division, National Coal Board.
- Sydney Edgar Shotter, Higher Executive Officer, Ministry of Transport & Civil Aviation.
- Kenneth Wilson Silverthorne, Assistant County Agricultural Officer, Wiltshire.
- Ernest Simpson, Chairman and Managing Director, Berry Hill Brickworks Ltd.
- William Charles Sinclair, Secretary, Manchester & District Engineering Employers' Association.
- Sarah Smith, Chairman, Burnley, Nelson & District War Pensions Committee, Lancashire.
- Nathalie Rose May Smythe, Head Occupational Therapist, Medical Rehabilitation Unit, Royal Air Force, Chessington.
- Captain Valentine Charles Soggee, lately Assistant Secretary, Royal Tournament.
- Alexander Welsh Somerville, Youth Welfare Worker, Edinburgh.
- Victor Christopher Sonnex, Attached War Office.
- James Murray Spey, Senior Information Officer, Central Office of Information.
- William Temple Spittle, lately Station Superintendent, West Ham Generating Station, London Division, Central Electricity Authority.
- William Stanton, Deputy Chief Officer, Northamptonshire Fire Brigade.
- Lady Helen Maud Stead, Assistant, Drama Booking Section, British Broadcasting Corporation.
- Charles Howard Steel, Chairman, Lydney Savings Committee, Gloucestershire.
- Gordon Henry Steer, Cabin Services Officer, British Overseas Airways Corporation.
- Samuel Fulton Strang, Chairman, Royal Naval Volunteer Reserve Club (Scotland).
- Margaret Ann Sutherland, Head Teacher, Costa Primary School, Evie, Orkney.
- George Percy Sutton, Assistant Chief Constable, Essex Constabulary.
- Wallace Ivor Roy Symes, Senior Survey Clerk, Marine Survey Office, Ministry of Transport & Civil Aviation.
- Mary Ruth Tabor, Housing Manager, Stevenage Development Corporation.
- Alice Tasker, Member, representing South West Hertfordshire, National Savings Assembly.
- Arthur Taylor, Chief Safety Engineer and Civil Defence Controller for Richard Thomas & Baldwins Steel Company of Wales.
- Frederick Taylor, Senior Executive Officer, Ministry of Supply.
- John William Taylor, Grimsby Representative, British Trawler Owners Association.
- Owen John Thomas, Trade Union Organiser, National Association of Operative Plasterers.
- Harold Thornton, Tees District Secretary, Amalgamated Engineering Union.
- Tracy Philip Tilbrook, Chairman, Reigate & District Local Employment Committee.
- Eleanor Winefride Tindall. For services to the Girl Guide Movement in Norfolk.
- John Todd, Chairman, Penrith District Committee, Cumberland Agricultural Executive Committee.
- Henry Toon, Chairman, Stone & Newcastle District Committee, Staffordshire Agricultural Executive Committee.
- Major William De la Court Topley, TD, Senior Executive Officer, General Post Office.
- James Treadgold, BEM, lately Principal Station Radio Officer, Admiralty Civilian Shore Wireless Service.
- George Edward Tregoning, JP, Chairman, Chester Sea Cadet Corps Unit.
- Edward William Tuck, Head of Supply Group, Engineering Equipment Department, British Broadcasting Corporation.
- Denys William Tucker, Assistant Principal Clerk and Press Officer, Board of Inland Revenue.
- Ralph Edward Tugman, Safety Officer, Alkali Division, Imperial Chemical Industries Ltd.,
- James Kennedy Turnbull, Chief Financial Officer, South Shields District Hospital Management Committee.
- Ernest Leslie Turnock, Chief Committee Clerk, Lancashire County Council.
- The Reverend Kenneth Hope Tyson, Church of Scotland Minister, Lausanne, Switzerland.
- Herbert Willan Wadge, Member, National Schools Advisory Committee, National Savings Committee.
- Charles George Harry Walker, Works Manager, HM Stationery Office.
- Margaret Crichton Walker, Burgh Organiser, Ayr, Women's Voluntary Services.
- Norman John Jamieson Walker, Honorary Secretary, Aberdeenshire Local Savings Committee.
- Joseph Michael Anthony Wall, Assistant Regional Manager, South Eastern Region, Central Land Board and War Damage Commission.
- Randolph Warburton, Grade 5 Officer, Selby Employment Exchange, Ministry of Labour & National Service.
- Charles Walter Benjamin Watford, Higher Executive Officer, Air Ministry.
- Samuel Watts, Manager, Plane Department, C. & J. Hampton Ltd., Sheffield.
- John Ivor Webb, Civil Defence Officer, A. Guinness, Son & Co. Ltd.
- William James Weightman, Senior Executive Officer, Tithe Redemption Commission.
- Ronald Victor Welch, Superintendent, Reproduction Staff, Ordnance Survey Department, Southampton.
- Basil Edward Wells, Chief Male Nurse, Royal Naval Hospital, Great Yarmouth.
- William Whale, Technical Officer, British Nylon Spinners Ltd., Pontypool, Monmouthshire.
- Katherine Marie Whelan. For political services in Hammersmith.
- Elizabeth Alice Maud Whitehouse. For political and public services in Rowley Regis and Tipton.
- George Whitley, Engineering Labour Supply Officer, Ministry of Labour & National Insurance, Northern Ireland.
- Edith Jean Whittaker, Honorary Secretary, Aspull and Blackrod Savings Committee, Lancashire.
- Ottilia Louisa Wiles, Centre Organiser, Beddington and Wallington, Women's Voluntary Services.
- Horace Oxley Wilkin, Partner, Cruso & Wilkin, King's Lynn, Norfolk.
- Samuel Augustine Wilkins, Assistant Postmaster, Head Post Office, Bournemouth.
- Frederick Oliver Wilks, Grade 4 Officer, Ministry of Labour & National Service.
- Ewart Harrod Williams, Principal Scientific Officer, Ministry of Works.
- John Owen Williams. For services to Welsh Literature.
- Richard Jones Williams, Senior Experimental Officer, Meteorological Office, Air Ministry.
- Captain Thomas John Willis, Master, MS Sonority, F. T. Everard & Sons Ltd.
- Helen Primrose Wilson, Vice-President, Alva and Menstrie Division, Clackmannan County, British Red Cross Society (Scottish Branch).
- Robert Hugh Winder District Inspector, Royal Ulster Constabulary.
- Albert Edward Winslade, Principal Foreman of Storehouses, Admiralty.
- Observer Lieutenant Clifford Marshall Wolstenholme, Group Officer, No. 19 Group, Royal Observer Corps, Manchester.
- Charles Ernest Wood, Higher Executive Officer, Ministry of Agriculture, Fisheries & Food.
- William Wright, lately Senior Executive Officer, Department of Agriculture for Scotland.
- Thomas Young, Honorary Treasurer, Scottish Youth Hostels Association.
- David Younger, District House Coal Officer, Dundee Area, Scottish Region.
- Joan Inman Franklin-Adams, MB, BS. For services in Jordan under the Save the Children Fund.
- Victor Alazrachi, British subject resident in Morocco.
- Doris Marion Angell, Principal of the Maddox Academy, Mexico City.
- Lilian Anthea Clayton, lately Head of Welfare Section, Sudan Government Agency in London.
- Alec Crackston, lately Head of Accounts Section, Sudan Government Agency in London.
- Edith Siems Davies, Her Majesty's Vice Consul at Kiel.
- Margery Elspeth Alice Ewing, Shorthand typist at Her Majesty's Embassy in Washington.
- John Robert Giles, Assistant Permanent Way Engineer, Iraqi State Railways.
- Geoffrey William Greenacre, British subject resident in Venezuela.
- Stephen Howell Griffith, Schoolmaster at the Victoria College, Cairo.
- Philip William Raymond Chatterton Haley, Her Majesty's Vice-Consul at Düsseldorf.
- Frederick George Hewitt, British subject resident in Paraguay.
- Albert Ernest Howell, Director of the British Institute, Turin.
- Ada Alwine Louise Johnson, British subject resident in Portugal.
- Frederick Thomas Henry Kempson, Archivist at Her Majesty's Consulate General, Haifa.
- Veronica Lorentzen, Grade III Clerk at Her Majesty's Consulate, Bergen.
- Charles Sinhuber Lottermoser, British subject resident in Argentina.
- Lilian Bernice Lynch, British subject resident in France.
- Esther Gwendoline Macfarlane, British subject resident in Switzerland.
- Sheikh Mansourbin Mohammed Abdul Rahim, Branch Manager of Messrs A. Besse & Co., Harar.
- Charles William Martin, lately Administration Officer at Her Majesty's Embassy in Saigon.
- Owen Robert O'Rafferty, Head of Communications Section, United Kingdom Delegation to the United Nations, New York.
- Cornelia Julia Polak, Her Majesty's Consul at Paris.
- James Ralph Shaw, lately Office Manager, Governor-General's Office, Khartoum.
- Marjorie Julie Simpson, Books Officer, British Council, Madrid.
- Captain Clarence Oswald Tucker, Superintendent Marine Operations, Kuwait Oil Co. Ltd.
- Anthony Lucrezio Francis Cajetan Vella, British Pro-Consul at Tunis.
- Alice Joyce Wingate, lately Personal Assistant to Her Majesty's Ambassador in Washington.
- William Frederick Baillie, formerly Chief Industrial Officer, Southern Rhodesia.
- Olive Gwendolyn Ballance. For services to Nursing in Southern Rhodesia.
- John Baulch. For municipal services in the State of Victoria.
- The Honourable Phyllis Jean Benjamin, JP, a Member of the Legislative Council, State of Tasmania. For political and social welfare services.
- Gordon Ross Chalmers, Wool and Mohair Officer, Basutoland.
- Bessie Champion. For services to mentally retarded children in the State of South Australia.
- George William Crittle, Honorary Treasurer, Limbless Soldiers' Association, State of Victoria.
- The Very Reverend Father Edward Enright, Superior of the Society of Jesus, and a Member of the Native Education Advisory Board, in Southern Rhodesia.
- Alfred Gilbert. For services to the United Kingdom community in Pakistan.
- Marion Hay, District Nurse, Hobart, State of Tasmania.
- Martha Beatrice Hayward. For public and social welfare services in Bulawayo, Southern Rhodesia.
- Richard Gibb Leven, Senior Works Superintendent, Public Works Department, Swaziland.
- Kathleen Rose McKillop. For services to Nursing, especially on behalf of those mentally ill, in the State of New South Wales.
- Dorothy Cora Eulalia Mearns, Confidential Secretary to the Resident Commissioner of Swaziland.
- Ernest Henry Midgley, District Officer, Bechuanaland Protectorate.
- Mona Rooksby, Chairman, British Women's Association, Bombay, India.
- Ellis Mary Agatha Fane-Saunders, until recently a member of the United Kingdom community in Karachi, Pakistan.
- Eleanor Ida Seitz, President of the Yopralla Hospital School for Crippled Children, State of Victoria.
- William Alexander Sloss, MB, FRCS(Ed), a Member of the Committee of Management of the Ballarat and District Base Hospital, State of Victoria. For public services.
- Frances Wilson, a resident of the Port Cygnet Municipality, State of Tasmania. For services to the community.
- The Reverend Francis St. Quintin Wyld, Church of England Chaplain of Darrang, Tezpur, Assam, India.
- Paul Abisheganaden, Assistant to the Organiser of Music, Education Department, Singapore.
- William Rex Lancelot Addison, MC, Assistant Secretary, Administrator's Office, East Africa High Commission.
- Charles Emanuel Agate, JP, For social welfare services in Jamaica.
- Okon Uwe Akan, Draughtsman (Senior Technical Staff Grade I), Survey Department, Eastern Region, Nigeria.
- Jacob Ojo Akinlami, Accountant, Marine Department, Federation of Nigeria.
- Abdul Hameed Alapafuja, Assistant Superintendent of Press, Printing Department, Eastern Region, Nigeria.
- John Kenneth Allen, Archivist, Federal Special Branch, Police Headquarters, Federation of Malaya.
- Marjorie Allinson, JP, Woman Labour Officer, Hong Kong.
- Sheikh Azzani, Rais, Hadhrami Bedouin Legion, Eastern Aden Protectorate.
- Evadne Louise Bailey, Nursing Supervisor, Jamaica.
- Theophilus Abiodun Bankole, Assistant Map Production Officer, Federal Survey Department, Federation of Nigeria.
- Owen Barnett Barton, Community Development Officer, Gold Coast.
- Michael Wales Bearcroft, Superintendent of Police, Kenya.
- Alhaji Bello, Legal Adviser, Emir of Katsina's Council, Northern Region, Nigeria.
- Mallam Muhammadu Bello. For public services in the Northern Region, Nigeria.
- Francis George Bernasko, Education Officer, Education Department, Gold Coast.
- Edward Murrell Blackman, Superintendent of the Leeward Islands Printing Office.
- Alice Boase. For public services in Uganda.
- Christiana Muriel Lightfoot-Boston, Senior Nursing Sister, Sierra Leone.
- William Brown, Assistant Works Manager, Public Works Department, Federation of Nigeria.
- William McLaren Campbell, Superintendent of Prisons, Kenya.
- Gerald Carey, Senior Master, St. Edwards College, Malta.
- Phoebe Hyacinthe Cave-Browne-Cave. For services to Education in Uganda.
- Chin Tsun Nyen, Broadcasting Assistant, Federation of Malaya.
- Ernest Landers Cooke, Chief Process Engraver, Federation of Nigeria.
- Eugene Felix Cornilliac, Executive Engineer, Works and Hydraulic Department, Trinidad.
- John Wheeler Court, Education Officer, Northern Region, Nigeria.
- James Kenneth Craig, MD, BCh, Provincial Medical Officer, Central Province, Kenya.
- Rosina Gwen Dabb, MB, ChB, Medical Officer in Charge of Church of Scotland Mission Hospital, Blantyre, Nyasaland.
- Vera Marian Davies, Woman Welfare Officer, Zanzibar.
- Archibald Charles Oluwole Dawodu, Senior Accountant, Federal Medical Service, Federation of Nigeria.
- Frank Sapenne Delisle. For public services in Montserrat, Leeward Islands.
- Colin Hampden Dickson, Lately Associate Secretary, Jamaica Civil Service Association.
- John Kwadwo Donkor. For services to the Co-operative movement in the Gold Coast.
- The Reverend Richard Preston Dyer, Headmaster of Queen's College, Nassau, Bahamas.
- Geoffrey James Ellerton, Assistant Financial Secretary, Kenya.
- Gilbert Francis Elliott, Lecturer and Demonstrator, Veterinary Services, Northern Rhodesia.
- Lilian Edith Emslie. For public services in Tanganyika.
- Ereramone Erimona, Lately Chief Inspector, Posts & Telegraphs Department, Federation of Nigeria.
- Fatima Fikree. For social welfare services in Aden.
- Albert Benjamin Foo, LRCS, LRCP, Maternity and Infant Welfare Officer, Municipal Infant Welfare Centre, British Guiana.
- Ernest Edward Frewin, Chief Technical Superintendent, Broadcasting Department, Gold Coast.
- Victor Harry Gale. For services to the Cotton Growing Industry in Nyasaland.
- Moses Gatt. For services to the Trade Union Movement in Malta.
- William Alfred John Geer, Chief Inspector of Works, Western Region, Nigeria.
- Festus Joseph George, Chief Storekeeper, Public Works Department, Sierra Leone.
- Major Terence Roland Glancy, Executive Officer, Provincial Emergency Committee, Kenya.
- Goh Chye Hin. For services to sport in Singapore.
- Pamela Mary Gouldsbury, Assistant Adviser on Aborigines, Federation of Malaya.
- Gavin Joseph Buckle Green, Senior Cooperative Officer, Tanganyika.
- Nathaniel Joseph Griffith, Bandmaster, St Lucia Police Force, Windward Islands.
- Owen Fitzwilliam Hamilton, Airport Manager, Hong Kong Airport.
- The Reverend William Thomas Harris. For missionary services in Sierra Leone.
- Cecil James Hooper, Lately Superintendent of Public Works, Seychelles.
- Gordon Arthur Howkins, Chief Meteorological Officer, Falkland Islands Dependencies Survey.
- Samson Mutekanga Iga, Senior Engineering Assistant, Kampala Technical Institute, Uganda.
- George Obonna Ihenacho, Senior Interpreter, Eastern Region, Nigeria.
- Venkateswara Madhusudhana Iyer, Assistant Superintendent, Registration Branch, Secretariat, Tanganyika.
- Harold Stormouth Jackson. For services to Education in British Guiana.
- Eric Roy Robert James, Chief Accountant, Trinidad Government Railways.
- Alice Marie Jones, Supervisor, Public Health Nursing Service, Bahamas.
- Sister Mary Joseph (Ann Beck), Sister-in-charge, Government Leprosarium, Tetere, British Solomon Islands Protectorate.
- Caroline Mary Veronica Kent, Organiser and Supervisor, Infants' and Junior Schools, Gibraltar.
- William Kimemia s/o Githu, Assistant Education Officer, Fort Hall District Education Board, Kenya.
- James Edward Knight, Station Manager, West African Council for Medical Research, Federation of Nigeria.
- Poh Cheng Kok. For public services in Kuantan, Federation of Malaya.
- Moletoba Jaga Peter Koledade, Headmaster, Sudan Interior Mission Central School, Kabba Province, Northern Region, Nigeria.
- Yu Siung Kong, Group Supervisor, Education Department, Sarawak.
- Machimanda Ganapathy Kushalappa, Statistical Assistant, Department of Mines, Tanganyika.
- Allan Anthony Lagrenade, Inspector of Schools, Grenada, Windward Islands.
- Dennis Hazeidene Lakin, District Officer, Kenya.
- William Berkley Lambert, District Officer, Kenya.
- The Reverend Harold Lane. For public services in Antigua, Leeward Islands.
- Hah Liong Lee. For social welfare services in Hong Kong.
- Lee Swee Ling. For social welfare services in Sarawak.
- James Francis Leembruggen, Electrical Engineer Central Electricity Board, Federation of Malaya.
- Athelstan Charles Ethelwulf Long, Administrative Officer, Northern Region, Nigeria.
- Elsie Ludlow, Acting Matron, Wesley Guild Hospital, Ilesha, Western Region, Nigeria.
- Margaret Robertson Mackenzie. For public services in the Federation of Malaya.
- Malcolm Alexander McLaren, Acting Road Traffic Commissioner, Northern Rhodesia.
- Walubita Makele, Lately Ngambela, Barotse Native Government, Northern Rhodesia.
- William Aubrey Manuel, Colonial Postmaster, Bermuda.
- Hasham Mitha. For public services in Uganda.
- Abdool Sakoor Sulliman Moos, Assistant Establishment Officer, Mauritius.
- Brother Cuthman (Charles Wolstan Morgan). Lately Senior Lecturer, Malta Government Training College for Men.
- Justino Daniel Mponda, Liwali of Newala, Tanganyika.
- Suleiman Dan Alhaji Nuhu, District Head, Dutse District, Kano, Northern Region, Nigeria.
- Chief Rwot Yona Odida, Langol Kop Madit, Acholi African Local Government, Uganda.
- Juliana Adeyinka Okunsanya. For public services in the Western Region, Nigeria.
- Clare Parnell. For welfare services to lepers in North Borneo.
- Robert Dean Pearson, Chief Health Inspector, Medical Department, Kenya.
- Andrew Blasius Pinto. For services to the Co-operative Movement in Singapore.
- George Chinniah Proctor, JP. For public services in Klang, Federation of Malaya.
- Ramaiyer Ramalingam, District Surveyor, Survey Department, Singapore.
- May Clementine Rodrigues. For services to the YWCA movement in British Guiana.
- Gilbert Frederick Roebuck, Higher Executive Officer, Office of the Crown Agents for Oversea Governments & Administrations.
- Max Peter Rohan. For public services in Mauritius.
- Margaret Sherrard Russell, Senior Education Officer, Sierra Leone.
- Ebenezer Ajayi Samuel, Assistant Superintendent of Press, Printing Department, Western Region, Nigeria.
- George McIntosh Sandy, JP. For services to Education in St. Vincent, Windward Islands.
- Chief Kundai Ole Sangale, Senior Chief of the Purko Section of the Masai tribe, Kenya.
- George Savva Savvides, Administrative Officer, Cyprus.
- George William Sims. For public services in Northern Rhodesia.
- Mohan Singh Gulab Singh, Clerk-Storekeeper, East African Railways & Harbours Administration.
- Isobel Slater, Organising Secretary, Royal Society for the Prevention of Cruelty to Animals, Tanganyika.
- Hubert Walter Smith, Telephone Engineer, Department of Information & Communications, British Honduras.
- Eleni Soper, Labour Officer, Cyprus.
- Esther Oladunni Soyanwo. For public services in the Western Region, Nigeria.
- Nora Stoute. For nursing services in Barbados.
- Enche Sudin bin Abdul Rahman, JP. For public services in Malacca, Federation of Malaya.
- Julie Symes, Queen Elizabeth's Oversea Nursing Service, Matron, Kingston Public Hospital, Jamaica.
- Squadron Leader Albert Richard Townsend. For services to the Malayan Air Training Corps, Singapore.
- Louis Francis Valantine, Secretary to the Minister of Works, Gambia.
- Winifred Annie Milnes-Walker. For nursing services in Uganda.
- Edward Frank Warburton, Chief Health Inspector, Hong Kong.
- Eliza Galloway Watson. For public services in Northern Rhodesia.
- Stanley Duncan Watson, Chief Draughtsman, Lands & Surveys Department, Tanganyika.
- Christian Charles Wienand. For public services in Northern Rhodesia.
- John Henry Willmott, Lately Town Clerk, Tanga Town Council, Tanganyika.
- John Leslie Malcolm Winter, Agricultural Superintendent, British Virgin Islands, Leeward Islands.
- Yew Sui Chang (known as Simon C. Yew). For services to the Boy Scout Movement in North Borneo.

Honorary Members

- Sallehuddin bin Awang Pekan. For public services in Pahang, Federation of Malaya.
- Lee Ah Soo, BEM, Chinese Affairs Officer, Federation of Malaya.
- Mohamed Ramly bin Haji Tahir, Assistant Agricultural Officer, Department of Agriculture, Federation of Malaya.
- Mohamedali Dhalla Kermali. For public services in Zanzibar.

=== Order of the Companions of Honour (CH) ===
- Edward Henry Gordon Craig. For services to the Theatre.
- Professor Arnold Joseph Toynbee, lately Director of Studies, Royal Institute of International Affairs. Lately Research Professor of International History, University of London.

=== Companion of the Imperial Service Order (ISO) ===
Home Civil Service

- Herbert James Blewett, OBE, Senior Chief Executive Officer, HM Stationery Office (Totteridge, N20.)
- Mark Brooks, Chief Executive Officer, Ottawa, Ministry of Pensions & National Insurance (Ottawa, Canada.)
- Kay Colvin, Chief Executive Officer, Board of Trade (Brondesbury Park, NW6.)
- Henry David Kingsley Davies, MC, Principal, Ministry of Labour & National Service (Bayswater, W2.)
- Albert Noel Dodson, Regional Director, Midland Region, Ministry of Fuel & Power (Birmingham.)
- Lawrence Frederick Field, Assistant Chief Inspector, Immigration Branch, Home Office (Wandsworth, SW18.)
- Leslie Alfred Griffith, Director of Stamping, Board of Inland Revenue. (Potters Bar, Middlesex.)
- Cedric Howarth, Assistant Director, Royal Engineer Equipment Branch, Ministry of Supply (Pimlico, SW1.)
- William George Jago, MBE, TD, Senior Chief Executive Officer, Foreign Office (Bonn, Germany.)
- Alexander Jolly, Assistant Secretary, Ministry of Works (Lower Edmonton, N9.)
- Percival Frank Jupe, OBE, Chief Executive Officer, HM Treasury (New Maiden, Surrey.)
- James Cockburn Mathison, Controller, Investigation Branch, Personnel Department, General Post Office (Palmers Green, N13.)
- Allan Milligan, Senior Inspector, Board of Customs & Excise (Epsom, Surrey.)
- Thomas Reginald Parsons, MBE, Chief Executive Officer, Colonial Office. (Send, Surrey.)
- Sidney Gilbert Pennells, OBE, Principal, Commonwealth Relations Office. (Coulsdon, Surrey.)
- Richard Stanley Perkins, TD, Deputy Director of Audit, Exchequer and Audit Department (Cheam, Surrey.)
- Percy Frederick George Robinson, MM, Chief Executive Officer, Ministry of Health. (Letchworth, Hertfordshire.)
- John Francis Sinclair, Principal, Ministry of Agriculture, Fisheries & Food. (Harrow, Middlesex.)
- Philip Sydney Montague Smith, Chief Executive Officer, Ministry of Housing & Local Government (Birmingham.)
- James Joshua Somper, Assistant Director of Finance, Central Land Board and War Damage Commission (Harrow, Middlesex.)
- Sydney Stanes, Deputy Director of Navy Contracts, Admiralty (Bath.)
- Frederic William Teare, Chief Accountant, Public Trustee Office (Sutton, Surrey.)
- John Williamson Thompson, lately Principal District Officer, Marine Survey Office, Belfast, Ministry of Transport & Civil Aviation.
- Reginald Iredale Wells, Principal Scientific Officer, Air Ministry (Medmenham, Buckinghamshire.)
- Harold Surridge Wren, Principal, War Office (Amersham, Buckinghamshire.)

State of South Australia and Bechuanaland Protectorate

- Reginald George Bailey, Office Superintendent, Government Secretariat, Bechuanaland Protectorate.
- Alex James Baker, Director of the Government Publicity and Tourist Bureau, State of South Australia.

Oversea Civil Service

- George Bond, Assistant Director of Electricity & Telephones, Mauritius.
- Frederick Caxton Johnson, Accountant, Post & Telegraphs Department, Federation of Nigeria.
- Frank Jones, lately Assistant Director (Marketing), Department of Marketing & Exports, Federation of Nigeria.
- Devon Francis McCaig, ED, Superintendent of Prisons, Fiji.
- Joseph Jonathan Meheux, lately Senior Accountant, Posts & Telegraphs Department, Sierra Leone.
- William Lavender Mussett, lately Chief Accountant, Malayan Railway, Federation of Malaya.
- Hugh Miller Williamson Nicholson, Chief Pharmacist, Medical Department, Tanganyika.
- Frederick Sander, Chief Accountant, Nigerian Railway, Federation of Nigeria.
- William Sprague, Assistant Director of Marine, Hong Kong.
- Richard Woolfall, Deputy Regional Director, East African Posts & Telecommunications Administration.
- Alfred Henry Zollner, Senior Accountant, Treasury Department, Federation of Nigeria.

=== British Empire Medal (BEM) ===
Military Division

Royal Navy

- Regulating Petty Officer Adam bin Ahmad, S/M.60, Royal Malayan Navy.
- Chief Petty Officer Cook (S) Henry George Barnett, D/Mx.50792.
- Quartermaster Sergeant Harold Thomas Bowden, PlyX.2556, Royal Marines.
- Regimental Sergeant Major George Leonard Bream, PlyX.3273, Royal Marines.
- Chief Aircraft Artificer Frank Brown, L/Fx.75113.
- Chief Petty Officer Paolo Bugelli, Malta E/Jx.141818.
- Chief Engine Room Artificer Charles Alfred Burton, D/Mx.60027.
- Chief Petty Officer Frederick John Butters, P/Jx.131146.
- Chief Engineering Mechanic Edward Richard John Chisell, D/Kx.84202.
- Sick Berth Chief Petty Officer Harry James Charles Cooper, P/Mx.52603.
- Stores Chief Petty Officer (V) Stanley Alfred Cranch, D/Mx.51157.
- Chief Aircraft Artificer John Greig Dewar, L/Fx.75608.
- Chief Petty Officer Thomas Eaton, P/J.22559.
- Chief Electrical Artificer Kenneth Hubert Hall, D/Mx.66236.
- Mechanician1st Class Arthur Denis Halls, P/Kx.578570.
- Chief Petty Officer Steward Leonard Pontifex Harrison, P/LI3562.
- Chief Petty Officer Telegraphist James Jervois, P/J.31778.
- Chief Petty Officer Telegraphist Duncan Murdoch McInnes, P/Jx.144238.
- Chief Wren Writer Joan Evelyn McManus, 2933, Women's Royal Naval Service.
- Chief Electrician Cyril Alfred Mixer, C/Mx.803721.
- Chief Electrical Artificer Harry Stephen Old, D/Mx.62284.
- Chief Petty Officer Arthur Isaac Poolman, D/J.35242.
- Chief Petty Officer Charles William Sharp, C/J.107835.
- Colour Sergeant James Short, PoX. 6358, Royal Marines.
- Chief Ordnance Artificer George Victor Sole, DSM, P/Mx.48584.
- Petty Officer Telegraphist (S) George Malcolm Stoot, D/Jx.646163.
- Chief Engine Room Artificer Leslie John Lloyd Syborn, D/Mx.50726.
- Chief Engineering Mechanic William John Toms, D/Kx.94399.
- Chief Petty Officer Telegraphist William George Tuckwell, P/Jx.140076.
- Chief Airman Fitter (O) Arthur Wilfrid Wayman, L/Fx.76280.
- Chief Petty Officer Stanley John West. D/J.115421.

Army

- 22258743 Staff-Sergeant (acting) (formerly Warrant Officer Class II (local)) William Frank Arnold, Royal Army Medical Corps.
- 832657 Sergeant Thomas Nicholas Ballantyne, Corps of Royal Electrical & Mechanical Engineers, Territorial Army.
- T/22234557 Sergeant Edward Byrne, Royal Army Service Corps.
- 1622871 Colour-Sergeant George James Alfred Cleak, The Sherwood Foresters (Nottinghamshire and Derbyshire Regiment).
- 7595181 Sergeant Eric Noel Clifford, Royal Regiment of Artillery.
- 2714831 Sergeant (local) James Doran, Irish Guards.
- 5183476 Sergeant (acting) Leslie Donald Field, The Gloucestershire Regiment.
- 7588320 Warrant Officer Class II (acting) William John Frederick Fletcher, Corps of Royal Electrical & Mechanical Engineers.
- 85154 2 Battery-Quartermaster-Sergeant James Frederick Gregory, Royal Regiment of Artillery.
- 14480236 Warrant Officer Class II (acting) Robert Stuart Hay, The Gordon Highlanders.
- S/860784 Warrant Officer Class II (acting) Hugh Hodgett, Royal Army Service Corps.
- S/64992 Staff-Sergeant Donald Richard Hordle, Royal Army Service Corps.
- S/14826036 Staff-Sergeant (acting) Norman Howells, Royal Army Service Corps.
- Sergeant (acting) Leonard Eric Irwin, Fermanagh Battalion, Home Guard.
- Warrant Officer Class II Karoti Shaibu, 1st (Nyasaland) Battalion, The King's African Rifles.
- S/22293977 Staff-Sergeant Jack Edwin Kingsbury, Royal Army Service Corps.
- T/280876 Warrant Officer Class II (acting) Frederick George Lewis, Royal Army Service Corps.
- 7366339 Warrant Officer Class II (acting) Frederick John Linde, Royal Army Medical Corps.
- 22512166 Staff-Sergeant Francis Xavier Magee, Royal Army Medical Corps, Territorial Army.
- 22211461 Staff-Sergeant Peter McGinley, Corps of Royal Engineers, Territorial Army.
- 7888254 Staff-Sergeant William Thomas Menhenick, Corps of Royal Electrical & Mechanical Engineers.
- 345 Waqueel Saeed Mihsin, Trucial Oman Scouts.
- 6002755 Staff-Sergeant (acting) Harold Benjamin Moore, Royal Army Pay Corps.
- Company-Quartermaster-Sergeant (acting) Robert Moyse, 9th West Lancashire Battalion, Home Guard.
- 22263595 Sergeant Lionel Francis Mundy, Army Catering Corps, Territorial Army.
- Regimental-Sergeant-Major (acting) Arthur Murphy, 15th West Lancashire Battalion, Home Guard.
- T/75757 Sergeant Ronald Bertram Nash, Royal Army Service Corps, Territorial Army.
- NA/29731 Company-Sergeant-Major Titus Wanini Numan, The Nigeria Regiment, Royal West African Frontier Force.
- GC/62991 Sergeant Samuel Osafo, Gold Coast Engineers, Royal West African Frontier Force.
- Warrant Officer Class I (acting) Eric James Painting, 16th/17th Kent Battalion, Home Guard.
- 6460456 Sergeant Kenneth Colin Watson Paterson, Army Catering Corps.
- Sergeant Thomas James Phillips, 42nd West Riding Battalion, Home Guard.
- 2613077 Colour-Sergeant (acting) William Price, Grenadier Guards.
- 22559493 Sergeant (acting) Gerard Joseph Quigley, Royal Army Veterinary Corps.
- 22281854 Warrant Officer Class II (local) Philip Edward Robbins, Corps of Royal Military Police.
- 7588787 Staff-Sergeant Victor Jack Rose, Corps of Royal Electrical & Mechanical Engineers.
- 22548994 Staff-Sergeant (acting) Thomas Albert Stephenson, Corps of Royal Electrical & Mechanical Engineers.
- 14994359 Colour-Sergeant Ian Wilson Swanston, Glider Pilot and Parachute Corps.
- 14442733 Colour-Sergeant Reginald Chamberlain Vine, The King's Own Scottish Borderers.
- Staff-Sergeant (acting) James McKerrow Walker, 1st/2nd Northumberland Battalion, Home Guard.
- Company-Sergeant-Major (acting) George Charles Fuller Waters, MM, 18th Sussex Battalion, Home Guard.
- 1415337 Sergeant George Webster, Army Catering Corps.
- S/14266606 Sergeant Stanley Williams, Royal Army Service Corps.
- 2329442 Squadron-Quartermaster-Sergeant Albert Reginald Wilson, Royal Corps of Signals.

In recognition of services in Korea during the period 28 July 1955 to 31 January 1956

- 2082596 Colour Sergeant William Watson Donaldson, The Queen's Own Cameron Highlanders.

Royal Air Force

- 528872 Flight Sergeant Alfred Albert Bailes.
- 566583 Flight Sergeant William Gordon Denny Brooks.
- 2682099 Flight Sergeant Raymond George Bryan, Royal Auxiliary Air Force.
- 565695 Flight Sergeant John Charles Burdett.
- 890580 Flight Sergeant Doris Emma Cooper, Women's Royal Air Force.
- 576099 Flight Sergeant John Lyon Copeland.
- 552850 Flight Sergeant Donald Thomas Davies.
- 570766 Flight Sergeant William Gordon Dawson.
- 643543 Flight Sergeant (now Warrant Officer) Godfrey George Eldridge.
- 518434 Flight Sergeant Malcolm Geddes.
- 545336 Flight Sergeant Thomas William Hall.
- 812106 Flight Sergeant Humphrey George Fitzgerald Hogg.
- 562743 Flight Sergeant John Ernest Horning.
- 591341 Flight Sergeant Leonard Albert Lintern.
- 567726 Flight Sergeant Leslie Preston Martin.
- 567094 Flight Sergeant Robert Henry Norms.
- 567794 Flight Sergeant (now Acting Warrant Officer) Donald Sims.
- 539109 Flight Sergeant Frederick George White.
- 544043 Chief Technician John Robert Clinton.
- 569693 Chief Technician Ronald Murphy.
- 534887 Chief Technician William George Pullen.
- 573876 Chief Technician Harold Wilson.
- 560227 Chief Technician Donald Thomas Yule.
- 1366944 Acting Flight Sergeant John Arthur.
- 771659 Acting Flight Sergeant Frederick James Conway.
- 525752 Acting Flight Sergeant Lewis Duffield.
- 435564 Acting Flight Sergeant Elsie Elizabeth Howe, Women's Royal Air Force.
- 629681 Acting Flight Sergeant Samuel McMaster.
- 614784 Acting Flight Sergeant Harold Edward Simpson.
- 2028702 Acting Flight Sergeant Denise Tom, Women's Royal Air Force.
- 2009384 Sergeant Kate Elizabeth Amos, Women's Royal Air Force.
- 652068 Sergeant Frederick Albert Baker.
- 2088056 Sergeant Bertha Barke, Women's Royal Air Force.
- 584744 Sergeant Robin Ellis Cooper.
- 577963 Sergeant Henry Hunter Cousins.
- 591914 Sergeant Peter Gascoigne.
- 611011 Sergeant Harry Hunter.
- 1282588 Sergeant Jeffrey Dowell Hunter.
- 2058890 Sergeant Rose Langley, Women's Royal Air Force.
- 533552 Sergeant Melville Keith McCandless.
- 525372 Sergeant Gordon Mutch.
- 2230383 Sergeant Samuel Roberts.
- 1647891 Sergeant William Robert Rose.
- 2651046 Sergeant Edwin Scott, Royal Auxiliary Air Force.
- 4005500 Corporal Patrick Creaney.

Civil Division

United Kingdom

- Stanley Ackland, Farm Foreman, Somerset Farm Institute, Cannington, Somerset.
- William Joseph Adnitt, Charge Hand Fitter, East Midlands Division, Central Electricity Authority (Northampton.)
- John Applegath, Driver and Chancery Guard, Her Majesty's Consulate, Lille.
- Alick Walter Bates, Boatswain, Maid of Orleans, British Transport Commission. (Dover.)
- Thomas Bennett, Lineman (Telegraph), Class I, Crewe, London Midland Region, British Railways, British Transport Commission.
- John Wade Birkbeck, Blind Telephonist, South Western Region, Ministry of Labour & National Service (St Austell, Cornwall.)
- Victor George Blewdon, Assistant Divisional Officer, London Fire Brigade.
- Emma Bolton, Centre Organiser, Chester-le-Street Rural District, Women's Voluntary Services (Birtley, County Durham.)
- George Albert Boxall, Laboratory Mechanic, Underwater Countermeasures & Weapons Establishment, Admiralty (Portchester, Hampshire.)
- Arthur Chamberlain Boyce, Civilian Warrant Officer, No. 2185 (Wareham) Squadron, Air Training Corps (Wareham, Dorset.)
- James Boyd, Bridgemaster, Kincardine-on-Forth Bridge, Ministry of Transport & Civil Aviation.
- Edwin Briers, Smith, Metropolitan-Cammell Carriage & Wagon Co. (Birmingham.)
- Christopher Henry Charles Brown, Foreman, Read & Partners, Electrical Engineering Contractors (Newbury, Berkshire.)
- Mary Bruce. For charitable services in Hebburn, County Durham.
- James Burkett, Foreman Electrician, Brigham & Cowan Ltd., South Shields.
- Charles Burn, Apprentice Instructor, Marshall Richards Machine Co. Ltd. (Chester-le-Street, County Durham.)
- Charles Burns, Chief Officer, Class I, HM Borstal Institution, Portland.
- William Charles Campbell, Setter "A", Chargehand, Royal Small Arms Factory, Ministry of Supply, Enfield (Chingford, E4.)
- George Tail Cargill, Head Chancery Guard, Her Majesty's Embassy, Paris.
- Samuel Caudwell, Ripper, Kiveton Park Colliery, North Eastern Division, National Coal Board (Sheffield.)
- Radcliffe Chapman, Telephonist (M), Rossendale Telephone Exchange, Lancashire. (Bury.)
- Sidney Frederick Clark, Inspector, Metropolitan Special Constabulary (West Baling, W13.)
- Thomas Welch Clark, Instructor, Civil Defence Corps, Gloucester.
- Gerald Ernest Charles Clarke, Sergeant, Admiralty Constabulary (Yeovil.)
- Charles Clegg, Overman, Wath Main Colliery, North Eastern Division, National Coal Board (Rotherham.)
- Mary Alexa Cockburn, Chief Supervisor, Post Office, Edinburgh (Portobello.)
- Albert Henry James Colenutt, Foreman Electrician, J. I. Thornycroft & Co. Ltd., Southampton.
- John Willie Cook, Chief Inspector, War Department Constabulary, Central Ordnance Depot, Didcot.
- Henry Cooley, Hand Clicker and Upper Leather Sorter, Manfield & Sons Ltd., Northampton.
- Emma Cooper, Auxiliary Postwoman, Ramsey, Huntingdon.
- George Henry Cooper, Exhauster Man, Wolverhampton District, West Midlands Gas Board (Wolverhampton.)
- Christie Louisa Cornelius, Mess Supervisor, Government Hostel, Singapore.
- John Brown Robb Danks, Technical Officer, Engineer-in-Chief's Office, General Post Office (Rugby.)
- George Davies, Repairer, Tymawr Colliery, South Western Division, National Coal Board (Pontypridd.)
- John Thomas Daye, Foreman Pests Operator, Ministry of Agriculture, Fisheries & Food. (Clarbeston Road, Pembrokeshire.)
- Alston Desborough, Instrument Assembler, Painton & Co. Ltd., Northampton.
- Thomas George Devine, Stores Superintendent, No. 61 Maintenance Unit, RAF Handforth. (Gatley, Cheshire.)
- Thomas Reginald Dew, Foreman Cleaner, British Broadcasting Corporation (Eltham, SE9.)
- Sister Mabel Alice Doncaster, Youth Leader, Church Army Youth Centre, Chelsea.
- William Eric Downes, Traffic Supervisor, Shell-Mex & BP, Fulham (Thames Ditton, Surrey.)
- William John Dyment, Development Engineer, W. & F. Wills Ltd., Bridgwater.
- Francis Joseph East, Handyman, Shrodells Hospital, Watford.
- William Albert Eaton, Head. Foreman, Bullet Proof & Armour Plate Shop, Hadfields Limited. (Sheffield.)
- Alfred Elwin, Office Keeper, Board of Customs & Excise (Leigh-on-Sea, Essex.)
- Violet May Emms, Drawing Office Assistant, National Physical Laboratory, Department of Scientific & Industrial Research. (Kingston upon Thames, Surrey.)
- Edwin Henry Finch, Printing Office Manager, Ministry of Works.
- Eva Fleming, Sister-in-Charge, Geriatric Ward, Hackney Hospital, London.
- Domenico Formosa, Principal Keeper, Red Sea Lighthouse Service.
- Dorothy Wilson Foxwell, Dispensing Assistant, West Herts Hospital.
- Albert Victor Funnell, Deputy Distribution Superintendent, Brighton Corporation Waterworks.
- William Richard Taylor-Gaskell, Mule Spinner, Talbot Spinning & Weaving Co. Ltd., Chorley.
- Jean Gately, British subject resident in Marysville, United States of America. For services during the flooding of the Feather River.
- Sydney Herbert Geoghan, Station Warden, RAF Tangmere (Chichester.)
- George Georgiadis, Sub-Inspector, RAF Police Auxiliaries, RAF Fayid (Alexandria.)
- Andrew Gibson, Colliery Lampman and Ambulance Attendant, Gartshore 3/12 Colliery, Scottish Division, National Coal Board (Stirling.)
- Harry James Goodman, Head Attendant, National Gallery (South Harrow, Middlesex.)
- William Cairn Gordon, Head Foreman, Rowan & Boden Ltd., Glasgow.
- James Herbert Gow, Technical Officer Grade II (Clerk of Works), Department of Health for Scotland (Juniper Green, Midlothian.)
- Hairy Cecil Greaves, Inspector (Engineering), Telephone Manager's Office, Sheffield.
- William Thomas Green, 2nd Class Engineer of Yard Craft, Admiralty (Portchester, Hampshire.)
- Albert Gregg, Head Constable, Royal Ulster Constabulary (Coleraine, County Londonderry.)
- Cecil Henry Hailstone, Sergeant, West Riding of Yorkshire Constabulary (Huddersfield.)
- Edith Haley, Honorary Collector, Street Savings Group, Egremont, Cumberland.
- Howard Septimus Hallett, Senior Assistant (Scientific), National Institute for Research in Dairying (Reading.)
- Alexander McLean Hamilton, Underground Development Worker, Bestwood Colliery, East Midlands Division, National Coal Board (Nottingham.)
- Joseph Hancock, General Maintenance Man, Exeter Gas Works, South Western Gas Board (Exeter.)
- William Arthur Harvey, Storekeeper, South Eastern Division, Central Electricity Authority (Southwick, Sussex.)
- Harry George Hemson, Detective Chief Inspector, Southend-on-Sea Constabulary.
- Alfred Hesler, Checkweighman, East Hetton Colliery, Durham Division, National Coal Board (Ferryhill.)
- Florence Maggie Higgins, Assistant Manageress, War Office Luncheon Club, London (Battersea, SW11.)
- William Higman, Station Officer, Cornwall Fire Brigade (St Columb.)
- Frank Higson, Weighman, Deane Colliery, North Western Division, National Coal Board (Bolton.)
- Albert Edward George Holding, Group Office Assistant, Explosives Research & Development Establishment, Ministry of Supply, Waltham Abbey (Enfield.)
- Albert Holloway, Able Seaman, SS San Fernando, Eagle Oil & Shipping Co. (Liverpool.)
- John Hopper, Crane Driver, North Eastern Division, Central Electricity Authority. (Newcastle upon Tyne.)
- John Edward Hughes, Chief Instructor and Technical Reconnaissance Officer, Civil Defence Corps, Brighton.
- Cecil George Humphreys, Head Gardener, French District, Imperial War Graves Commission.
- Charles Harry Humphries, Grinder, Experimental Department, Rotol Ltd., Gloucester.
- Henry Hymers, Grade1, Office Keeper, Foreign Office (Twickenham, Middlesex.)
- John Irwin, Fitter, Sirocco Engineering Works, Davidson & Co. Ltd., Belfast.
- Richard William Jackson, Chargehand, Allbright & Wilson Ltd. (Worcester.)
- Beatrice Ellen Grail James, Superintendent, Tenby Central School Meals Kitchen, Pembrokeshire.
- Ethel Annie Jenkins, Honorary Collector, Chargot Road Savings Group, Cardiff.
- William Charles Jennings, Assistant Inspector, Postmen's District Office, Hampton. Middlesex.
- Robert John Johnston, Head Messenger, Ministry of Education for Northern Ireland. (Belfast.)
- Henry John George Jones, Depot Chargeman, Boom Defence Depot, Admiralty, Aultbea, Ross-shire.
- Thomas Howard Kingston, Carpenter, Royal Ordnance Factories, Ministry of Supply, Woolwich (Plumstead, SE18.)
- Harry Kitchin, Mechanic, Safety in Mines Research Establishment, Ministry of Fuel & Power (Buxton, Derbyshire.)
- May Lane, Honorary Collector, Billet Lane Street Savings Group, Slough, Buckinghamshire.
- Walter Sword Lang, Boatswain, Fishery Cruiser Freya, Fishery Board for Scotland (Edinburgh.)
- Hugh Lavery, Checkweighman, Chester Moor Colliery, Durham Division, National Coal Board (Chester-le-Street, County Durham.)
- Chad Henry Law, Fittings Superintendent, Cardiff Undertaking, Wales Gas Board. (Cardiff.)
- George Arthur Daniel Lawrence, Shop Officeman, British Transport Docks, British Transport Commission (Newport, Mon.)
- Albert Edwin Lawrenson, Inspector (Postal), Head Post Office, Chorley, Lancashire.
- Ernest Lee, Purifier. Foreman, Salford Works, Manchester Group, North Western Gas Board (Pendlebury, Lancashire.)
- Eric Frank Lefort, Club Manager, NAAFI, Korea.
- Horace Lewin, Chief Officer, Class II, HM Prison Sudbury Park.
- John William Little, Honorary Collector, Allerton Road Savings Group, Stoke Newington, N16.
- Doris Joyce Annie Longman, Assistant Supervisor, Central Telegraph Office, General Post Office (Putney, SW15.)
- Edward Pattison Lovell, Clerk of Works, War Office, Bedford.
- Hugh Lusk, Overseer, Head Post Office, Belfast.
- Hugh McCorquodale, Boatswain's Mate, SS Empire Clyde, Anchor Line Ltd. (Glasgow.)
- Andrew MacDonald, Head Shepherd, Glasgow Corporation Water Department's Farms, Callander.
- William McIntyre, Honorary Group Collector, Works Savings Group, Bessbrook Spinning Co. Ltd., County Armagh.
- James Mackenzie, Sub-Officer, Perth and Kinross Fire Brigade (Blairgowrie, Perthshire.).
- Jean Mackie, Centre Organiser, Peterculter, Women's Voluntary Services.
- Thomas McMynn, Curator of Burns Cottage, Ayr.
- William Lusk McNeill, Postman, Tarbert, Argyll.
- James Alexander Marsden, lately Chief Office Keeper, Admiralty (Brixton, SW2).
- Frank Arthur Moody, Electrician's Mate, SS Pretoria Castle, Union-Castle Line. (Southampton.)
- Frederick Peter Mowles, Chargehand, R. & D. Craftsman (Painter), Royal Aircraft Establishment, Ministry of Supply, Farnborough.
- Christopher Neary, Chargeman Fitter, Ashford Locomotive Works, Southern Region, British Railways, British Transport Commission.
- Ralph Edgar Newman, Chief Observer, Post 6/J1, No.6 Group, Royal Observer Corps. (Fakenham, Norfolk.)
- Harry Nicholls, School Staff Instructor, Hulme Grammar School, Oldham.
- Mansoor Bin Haji Noor, Foreman Waterman, War Department Fleet, Singapore.
- George Olsen, Horizontal Borer, Dawson & Downie Ltd., Clydebank (Glasgow.)
- Thomas Edward Ormond, Honorary Collector, Pine Grove Street Savings Group, Sheringham, Norfolk.
- Herbert Curtis Page, Fitter, East Midlands Division, Central Electricity Authority. (Nuneaton, Warwickshire.)
- Alfred de Burgh Parkman, Chief Steward, MV British Soldier, British Tanker Co. Ltd. (Huddersfield.)
- Leonard Parry, Meter Department Foreman, South Eastern Electricity Board (Mitcham, Surrey.)
- Robert Peart, General Foreman, Stanley Works and District, Northern Gas Board. (Stanley, County Durham.)
- Harry Pocock, General Foreman, Thames Conservancy (Reading.)
- Lionel Ivor Pope, R. and, D (Special) Joiner, Royal Aircraft Establishment, Ministry of Supply, Farnborough.
- Ellen Victoria Povoas, Driver, Grade II, Government Car Service, Ministry of Works. (Tottenham, N15.)
- Fred Pringle, Custodian, Byland Abbey, Yorkshire, Ministry of Works.
- Griffith Richard Pritchard, Surface Labourer, Aberaman Colliery, South Western Division, National Coal Board (Aberdare.)
- John Warren Pullen, Sub-Postmaster, Chorleywood Town Sub Office, Rickmansworth, Hertfordshire.
- George Graham Purvis, Inspection Foreman, Vickers-Armstrongs (Engineers) Ltd., Newcastle upon Tyne.
- Robert George William Read, Research and Development Mechanic (Special) Chargehand, Atomic Weapons Research Establishment (Basingstoke, Hampshire.)
- Ogle Waite Redpath, Filler, Stobswood Colliery, Northern (Northumberland & Cumberland) Division, National Coal Board.
- Robert Smith Reid, First Aid Instructor, Civil Defence Corps, Greenock Division.
- Frank Leonard Relf, Instructional Officer, Grade III, Admiralty (Rosyth, Fife.)
- George William Richardson, Toolroom Inspector, Vickers-Armstrongs (Engineers) Ltd., Weymouth.
- Harold Roberts, Regimental Quarter-Master Sergeant, Army Cadet Force, Cheshire Regiment (Altrincham.)
- Clifford Llewellyn Roe, Technician, Class I, Post Office Telephones, Carmarthen.
- Edward Thomas Rogers, Warden, Territorial Army Centre, Sevenoaks.
- Sydney Fison Rogers, Postman, Higher Grade, Plymouth,
- Sevilla Lily Romet, Floor Manageress, Bonder Ltd., Pentrebach, Glamorganshire.
- Marjorie Ross, Deputy County Borough Organiser, Doncaster, Women's Voluntary Services'
- Horace James Scambler, Driver, Saltley Motive Power Depot, London Midland Region, British Transport Commission. (Birmingham.)
- John William Alfred Scanlon, Engine Fitter, Vosper Ltd., Portsmouth (Southsea, Hampshire.)
- Margaret Eleanor Scholfield, JP, Honorary Collector, Sandhall Savings Group, Howden, East Yorkshire.
- Reginald Seabrook, Works Technical Officer, Grade IV, Building Research Station, Department of Scientific & Industrial Research (Bushey, Hertfordshire.)
- Mabel Alice Shaw, Sub-Postmistress, High Cross Street Post Office, Leicester.
- Leonard Shears, Manager, Kidlington, Oxford, Silo, Government Grain Silo Co. (Oxford.).
- Daniel Harold Smith, Foreman, Shell Refining & Marketing Co. Ltd., Stanlow. (Ellesmere Port, Cheshire.)
- Herbert Smith, Foreman Dyer, Kangol Wear Ltd. (Moor Row, Cumberland.)
- Joseph Smith, Storeman, Grade II, Royal Ordnance Factory, Ministry of Supply, Swynnerton, Staffordshire (Stoke-on-Trent.)
- Percy Stanley Smith, Leading Storeman, Royal Ordnance Factories, Ministry of Supply, Woolwich (Plumstead, SE18.)
- Thomas Smith, Marine Rigger, No. 238 Maintenance Unit, RAF Calshot (Gosport.).
- Victor Claude Albert Smithers, Gardener Caretaker, Anzac Agency, Imperial War Graves Commission, Melbourne.
- Walter Starr, Toolroom. Foreman, Pulsometer Engineering Co. Ltd., Reading.
- William Charlesworth Stead, Underground Road Repairer, Old Roundwood Colliery, North Eastern Division, National Coal Board (Wakefield.)
- William Frederick Steers, Inspector, Telephone Manager's Office, City Area, London. (Barnehurst, Kent.)
- James Stephenson, Training Face Supervisor, Tanfield Lea Colliery, Durham Division, National Coal Board.
- Arthur James Thomas, Member, Coast Life Saving Corps, and Volunteer-in-Charge, Broadhaven L.S.A. Company, Pembrokeshire (Haverfordwest.)
- Percy Leonard Thomas, Pithead Baths Superintendent, Princess Royal Colliery, South Western Division, National Coal Board. (Lydney, Gloucestershire.)
- Gavin Thomson, Tipper and Coal Checker, Clyde's Mill Generating Station, South of Scotland Electricity Board (Carmyle, Lanarkshire.)
- Margaret Grosvenor Tomkinson, Technical Reconnaissance Officer and Instructor, Civil Defence Corps, Shropshire (Tenbury.)
- Joseph Henry Trevaskis, Office Keeper, Grade I, Ministry of Pensions & National Insurance (Gateshead.)
- Judith Marjorie Trist, Centre Organiser, Wellington Rural District, Women's Voluntary Service.
- Lydia Eliza Alice Trow, Honorary Collector, Street Savings Group, Willenhall (Staffordshire.)
- Harry Turner, Traffic Inspector, Class 'B', British Transport Waterways, British Transport Commission (Bow, E3.)
- Herbert Alfred Turner, Foreman Fitter, Associated Portland Cement Manufacturers Ltd. (Barnstone, Nottinghamshire.)
- Thomas Richard Tutt, Chief Supervisor (Telephones), General Post Office, Eastbourne.
- Richard Twells, Chargehand, Litchurch Works, Derby Undertaking, East Midlands Gas Board (Derby.)
- Elijah Twigger, JP, Goods Guard, Nuneaton (Trent Valley), London Midland Region, British Railways, British Transport Commission.
- Harold George Upton, Divisional Officer, St. John Ambulance Brigade, Northamptonshire. (Weedon.)
- Roderick Alexander Urquhart, Laboratory Attendant, Royal Botanic Garden Edinburgh.
- Percy Ridgeley Nash Ward, Warden, The David Bruce Laboratories, War Office, Marlborough.
- George Edward Warters, Senior Inspector, Corps of Custodians, Offices of the House of Lords (Balham, SW17.)
- Arthur Raymond Way, Deputy Commandant, Swansea Special Constabulary.
- George William West, Foreman Printer, Office of the Receiver for the Metropolitan Police District (Camberwell, SE5.)
- George Victor White, Supervising Instructor, 8 Basic Trade Training Battalion, War Office (Taunton.)
- Thomas Williamson, Fore-Overman, Whitburn Colliery, Durham Division National Coal Board.
- Arthur Benjamin Winsor, Supervising Instructor, Grade I, No. 4 School of Technical Training, RAF St Athan. (Glamorgan.)
- Sidney Benjamin Woodhouse, lately Superintendent, Distribution Repair Shops, Tottenham Division, Eastern Gas Board (Tottenham, N17.)
- Arthur Wright, Ripper, Savile Colliery (Methley), North Eastern Division, National Coal Board (Leeds.)
- Mabel Amelia Wulff, Caretaker of the English Church, Hamburg.
- Bertie Herbert Young, Foreman Quay Supervisor, Elders & Fyffes, Avonmouth, (Bristol.)
- William Young, Inspector, Head Post Office, Luton.

Australia

- William Goward, Chief Guard, Yatala Labour Prison, State of South Australia.
- Joseph Newman, Housekeeper, Department of Legislative Assembly, State of Victoria.

Federation of Rhodesia and Nyasaland.

- Angus Wyper, lately Foreman, Department of Public Works, Federation of Rhodesia and Nyasaland.

Southern Rhodesia

- Johannes Thomas Nicholas Meyer, Inspector, British South Africa Police Reserve

Basutoland

- Elliott Beibi Ramaqabe, lately Supervisor of Schools, Education Department, Basutoland.

Swaziland

- Makhabane Bhembe, Paramount Chiefs Representative, Usutu Forests, Swaziland.

Oversea Territories

- Livingstone Fitzgerald Glasgow, Engine Driver, Waterworks Department, Barbados.
- Arlington Colin Levi Van Gronigen, Government Sicknurse-Dispenser, North West District, British Guiana.
- Moustafa Tewfik Ali, Chief Foreman, Public Works Department, Cyprus.
- Mehmed Ali Rouhi, Tugmaster, Customs & Excise, Cyprus.
- George Biggs, Foreman, East African Railways & Harbours Administration, East Africa High Commission.
- Violet Alice Mayne, Head of Department Telephone Exchange, East African Income Tax Department, East Africa High Commission.
- Yokana Asafu Nsubuga, Telegraphist, East African Posts & Telegraphs Administration, East Africa High Commission.
- Edwin Thomas Lee, Head Shepherd, Falkland Islands.
- Sister Maria Sesarina, Member of the Society of Little Sisters of Mary, Fiji.
- Daniel Teye Mensah, Chargeman, Public Works Department, Gold Coast.
- Solomon Rafeek, Officer-in-Charge, Demonstration Team, Civil Aid Services, Hong Kong.
- Leslie Bunting Williams, Supervisor, Steam Section, Locomotive Branch, Government Railway, Jamaica.
- Gurdit Singh Johl, Forester, Forest Department, Kenya.
- Frederick George Bailey Peace, Field Intelligence Officer, Kenya.
- Mahomed Muthihiri, Chairman, Pumwani Village Committee, Kenya.
- Hezekiah Nyaga s/o Njeroge, 1st Grade Tribal Police Constable, Kenya.
- Leonora Adina Greenaway, Matron, Monserrat Infirmary, Leeward Islands.
- Haji Ahim bin Katek, Penghulu, Jasin District, Malacca, Federation of Malaya.
- Sellappah Elankanayagam, Overseer, Public Works Department, Federation of Malaya,
- Mohamed Ibrahim bin Kassim Ali, Technical Assistant, Telecommunications Department, Kelantan, Federation of Malaya.
- Joseph Philip, Chief Storekeeper, Drainage and Irrigation Department, Federation of Malaya.
- Mohamed Rani bin Haji Abdul Salim, Caretaker and Storekeeper, King's House, Kuala Lumpur, Federation of Malaya.
- Enid Surin, Telephone Supervisor, Kuala Lumpur, Federation of Malaya.
- Wong Ah Lum, Financial Assistant, General Clerical Service, Federation of Malaya Police.
- Yeo Seng Lee, Laboratory Assistant, Department of Chemistry, Federation of Malaya.
- Haji Yusope bin Aman, Demang, Jasin District, Malacca, Federation of Malaya.
- Stephen Adeyemi, Waterguard Officer, HM Customs & Excise, Federation of Nigeria.
- Ben Uyanwune Mbonu, Chief Warder, Lagos Prison, Federation of Nigeria.
- Stephen Chukwunweuba Balonwu, Assistant Agricultural Officer, Agriculture Department, Eastern Region, Nigeria.
- Okoedon Alenewose Alihu, Chief Ranger, Forest Department, Western Region, Nigeria.
- Josephine Olabopo Durojaiye, Principal Midwife, Egba Native Authority Infant Welfare Service, Western Region, Nigeria.
- Samson Locha Ngambela, lately Head Messenger, Mankoya District, Northern Rhodesia.
- Edward Kaiwonanga Gondwe, Inspector of Schools, Education Department, Nyasaland.
- Morlai Koroma, Foreman Mechanic, Chrome Mines, Sierra Leone.
- Ahmad bin Hassan, Seed Collector, Botanic Gardens, Singapore.
- John Arthur Dragon, Technical Assistant, Public Works Department, Singapore.
- Mohamoud Hassan, Sergeant Major, Protectorate Tribal Police, Somaliland.
- Herbert Thomas Browne, Assistant Inspector, Roads, Public Works Department, Tanganyika.
- Ramathani Kanuwa, Minister to the Chiefs of Unyanyembe, Tanganyika.
- William Manning, Medical Assistant, Medical Department, Tanganyika.
- William Mashimbi Humba, Chief of Mwakarundi, Tanganyika.
- John Harrison Armstrong, lately Government Messenger, Sub-Treasury and Post Office, Tobago, Trinidad.
- Maega'Asia Salathiel Salana, Member of the Malaita District Council, Western Pacific High Commission.
- Yusef bin Abdulla el Baluchi, Bailiff, Pemba, Zanzibar.

=== Royal Victorian Medal (RVM) ===
In Gold

- Walter Hodges.

In Silver

- Police Constable Ernest Albert Andrews, Metropolitan Police
- Frederick Bradshaw.
- William Aldridge Burkmar.
- Henry Walter Camm.
- George Disbury.
- Chief Petty Officer John Charles Griffin, P/J.110473.
- Richard Thomas Joslin.
- Albert George Key.
- James Harper Macdonald.
- William MacGregor.
- Francis Leonard Mainwood.
- Petty Officer Cook (O) John Garratt Matthews, P/L.12679.
- Martin Edward Warne, lately Police Constable, Metropolitan Police.

=== Royal Red Cross (RRC) ===
- Kathleen Mary Greenwood, ARRC, Principal Matron, Queen Alexandra's Royal Naval Nursing Service.
- Lieutenant-Colonel Phyllis Eva Wilkins, ARRC (206523), Queen Alexandra's Royal Army Nursing Corps.
- Squadron Officer Pauline Giles, ARRC. (405105), Princess Mary's Royal Air Force Nursing Service.

==== Associate of the Royal Red Cross (ARRC) ====
- Ruth Stone, Senior Nursing Sister, Queen Alexandra's Royal Naval Nursing Service.
- Captain Ann O'Garra (329864), Queen Alexandra's Royal Army Nursing Corps.
- Captain Enid Thomas (306000), Queen Alexandra's Royal Army Nursing Corps.
- Squadron Officer Agnes Williamson McMillan Limerick (405445), Princess Mary's Royal Air Force Nursing Service.

=== Air Force Cross (AFC) ===
- Air Commodore George Augustus Walker, CBE, DSO, DFC, ADC.
- Wing Commander Ivor Gordon Broom, DSO, DFC (112392).
- Wing Commander Rowland John Dempsey, DFC (59074).
- Wing Commander Ronald George Knott, DSO, DFC (39442).
- Wing Commander Rupert Gordon Westley Oakley, DSO, DFC, DFM (61011).
- Wing Commander Frank Geoffrey Woolley, DFC (105174).
- Squadron Leader Desmond Fitzalan Monteagle Browne (163501).
- Squadron Leader Harry Dashwood Byrne (500168).
- Squadron Leader Michael Edward Hobson (58309).
- Squadron Leader Allan James Houston (124486).
- Squadron Leader Robert Arthur Seymour (158892).
- Squadron Leader Edward Barnes Sismore, DSO, DFC (130208).
- Flight Lieutenant Ronald Maurice Dubock (151108).
- Flight Lieutenant Hugh Harrison (3041680).
- Flight Lieutenant George Perryman Jones (155413).
- Right Lieutenant William Kay (171099).
- Flight Lieutenant James Alexander Kennedy (655853).
- Flight Lieutenant Arthur John Mills (54154).
- Flight Lieutenant Ivor Bennett Webster (1890026).
- Flight Lieutenant Andrew Leighton Wilson (188411).
- Flight Lieutenant Robert Ian Young (3012399).
- Flying Officer William Charles King (4032244).

==== Bar to Air Force Cross ====
- Air Vice-Marshal John René Whitley, CB, CBE, DSO, AFC.
- Wing Commander Donald Kingston Warburton, AFC, (110802).
- Squadron Leader Arthur Ashworth, DSO, DFC, AFC (43699).
- Squadron Leader Norman Edward Hoad, AFC (143275).

=== Air Force Medal (AFM) ===
- 1431384 Flight Sergeant Douglas Malcolm Colman.
- 591493 Flight Sergeant (now Master Engineer) George Oliver Dalgarno.
- 1321034 Flight Sergeant (now Master Pilot) William Thomas Jackson.
- 1387472 Flight Sergeant (now Master Pilot) Richard Livermore.
- 3001427 Flight Sergeant Stanley Nicholls.
- 654676 Flight Sergeant (now Master Pilot) Frederick Ormonde Robertson.
- 1604985 Flight Sergeant William James Ryall.
- 1590778 Flight Sergeant Leonard West Shout.
- 1323588 Flight Sergeant (now Master Pilot) Arthur William Vine.
- 628807 Acting Flight Sergeant Arthur Coad.

=== Queen's/King's Commendation for Valuable Service in the Air ===
Royal Air Force

- Wing Commander Edgar James, DFC, AFC (87346).
- Squadron Leader Douglas Alaric Boards, DFM (156327).
- Squadron Leader Alistair Donald Boyle (128557).
- Squadron Leader John Eric Burton (200893).
- Squadron Leader Harry George Currell, DFC, AFC (153944).
- Squadron Leader Arthur Harper (57079).
- Squadron Leader Frederick Samuel Hazlewood, AFC (55087).
- Squadron Leader Hugh Lionel Jones (153766).
- Squadron Leader Robert Alec Charles Kendell (150657).
- Squadron Leader Keith Bernard Rogers, DFC, AFC (59741).
- Squadron Leader Robert Sidney Salmon (178280).
- Squadron Leader William JamesSwift (41494).
- Acting Squadron Leader Cecil Alan Tomlinson, AFC (150683).
- Acting Squadron Leader Ronald Stuart Wambeek, DFC, MRCS, LRCP (138668).
- Flight Lieutenant George Michael Bailey (180527).
- Flight Lieutenant John Stanley Francis Blundell, DFC (153641).
- Flight Lieutenant Roland Francis Chandler (126720).
- Flight Lieutenant John Martin Crowley (3039748).
- Flight Lieutenant George Frederick Gill (150523).
- Flight Lieutenant Tadeusz Hemsley (501627).
- Flight Lieutenant Ernest Eugene Owen Irish, DFC (126541).
- Flight Lieutenant Kenneth Geoffrey Jones, (186124).
- Flight Lieutenant Edmund Andrzej Ladro, DFC (500233).
- Flight Lieutenant Lachlan Mackinnon, DSC (501655).
- Flight Lieutenant Henry Alan Merriman (3108403).
- Flight Lieutenant Lawrence Arthur Newbon (136505).
- Flight Lieutenant AndrewNoble (173453).
- Flight Lieutenant Roy Alvin Osborne (185437).
- Flight Lieutenant Charles Richard Shanks, DFC (177689).
- Flight Lieutenant Erazm Wardzinski (500070).
- Flying Officer John Atkinson (578987).
- Flying Officer Thomas Reginald Gribble (607239).
- Flying Officer John Alexander Matheson (55054).
- Flying Officer Michael Richard Merrett (3510758).
- Flying Officer Gordon Ian Smith (2689557), Royal Auxiliary Air Force.
- Master Pilot James Lionel William Gresham (567560).
- Master Pilot Thomas Robinson (568712).
- Master Navigator James Henry Sabourin (570197).
- 1812778 Flight Sergeant David Ernest Wanstall.

United Kingdom

- Captain Donald Anderson, Flight Superintendent, Stratocruiser Fleet, British Overseas Airways Corporation.
- Douglas Haigh, DFM, First Officer, British European Airways.
- Captain Harry James Rose, Senior Captain, First Class, Constellation Fleet, British Overseas Airways Corporation.
- Oliver Beauchamp St. John, Senior Scientific Officer, Royal Aircraft Establishment, Ministry of Supply.
- Dennis Graham William Tayler, DFC, Civilian Test Pilot, Royal Aircraft Establishment, Ministry of Supply.
- Captain Eric Ronald Watts, Senior Captain, Second Class, British European Airways.
- Captain Stanley George Websper, Senior Captain, Transair Ltd.

Oversea Territory

- Derek Charles Hellens, Chief Inspector, Kenya Police Reserve Air Wing.
- Colin Alexander Prichard, Chief Inspector, Kenya Police Reserve Air Wing.

=== Queen's Police Medal ===
England and Wales

- Major Sir Philip Reginald Margetson, KCVO, MC, Assistant Commissioner, Metropolitan Police.
- William Ewart Pitts, Chief Constable, Derbyshire Constabulary.
- Alexander James Paterson, BEM, Chief Constable Salford City Police Force.
- George James Blackborow, Assistant Chief Constable, Birmingham City Police Force.
- James Bertram Clifford Harris, Chief Superintendent and Deputy Chief Constable, Coventry City Police Force.
- George Thwaite, Chief Superintendent, Lancashire Constabulary.
- George James Sheppard, Superintendent and Deputy Chief Constable, Hastings Borough Police Force.
- John Hartley Newstead, Superintendent (Grade 1), Metropolitan Police.
- Hugh Ernest Jannaway, Superintendent (Grade 1), Metropolitan Police.
- Charles Frederick Large, Superintendent Gloucestershire Constabulary.
- Douglas Frank Benstead, Superintendent, Surrey Constabulary.
- Frederick James Thurley, Superintendent, Warwickshire Constabulary.

Scotland

- Allister McInnes, OBE, Chief Constable, City of Perth Police Force.
- Alexander Munro, Chief Superintendent, City of Glasgow Police Force.

Northern Ireland

- Robert Eakin, Head Constable, Royal Ulster Constabulary.

Southern Rhodesia

- Lieutenant-Colonel William Hampden Dawson Walker, MBE, Senior Assistant Commissioner of the British South Africa Police.

Oversea Territories

- Alexander John Waterfield Slater, Senior Assistant Commissioner of Police, Federation of Malaya.
- Hugh Blackburn Jervoise Donaldson, Assistant Commissioner of Police, Federation of Malaya.
- Talif bin Lisut, Assistant Commissioner of Police, Federation of Malaya.
- Julian Canning Day, Assistant Commissioner of Police, Northern Rhodesia.
- Charles James Anthony Haines, Superintendent of Police, Singapore.
- Brinley Lewis, Superintendent of Police, Singapore.
- Frederick Vincent Boswell, Senior Assistant Commissioner of Police, Tanganyika.
- James Bruce Gordon Austin, Chief of Police, Grenada, Windward Islands.

=== Queen's Fire Services Medal ===
England and Wales

- Leonard Philip Wright, Divisional Officer, London Fire Brigade.
- William Collow, MBE, Chief Officer, Norfolk Fire Brigade.
- Leslie Garside, Chief Officer, York Fire Brigade.
- Percy Albert Bloom, Assistant Chief Officer, Nottinghamshire Fire Brigade.
- Arthur Hallsworth, Divisional Officer, Derby County Borough Fire Brigade.

New Zealand

- Albert William Taylor, Chief Officer, Blenheim Volunteer Fire Brigade.
- John Wilson Kane, Chief Fire Officer, Gisborne Fire Brigade.

Oversea Territory

- Arthur Benjamin, Inspector, New Amsterdam Fire Brigade, British Guiana.

=== Colonial Police Medal ===
Southern Rhodesia

- Captain Samuel Verney Brewer, British South Africa Police.
- Captain Stanley Edwards, British South Africa Police.
- Captain Herbert Charles LomasBritish South Africa Police.
- Mgambiwa, Station Sergeant, British South Africa Police.
- Muchenje, Station Sergeant, British South Africa Police.
- Captain Richard John Parry, British South Africa Police.
- Captain Jack Redfern, British South Africa Police.
- Captain Richard Henry Sobey, British South Africa Police.
- Captain Roger Leslie Southgate, British South Africa Police.
- Captain James Spink, British South Africa Police.
- Captain Robert StokerBritish South Africa Police.

Bechuanaland

- James Bokowe, Sergeant-Major, Bechuanaland Protectorate Police Force.
- Edward Hugh Dalrymple Warren, Assistant Superintendent, Bechuanaland Protectorate Police Force.

Oversea Territories

- Raja Adnan bin Raja Abdullah, Assistant Superintendent, Federation of Malaya Police Force.
- Mark Akaluka, Sergeant-Major, Nigeria Police Force.
- Jama Ali, Inspector, Somaliland Police Force.
- Sam Danso Amaning, Assistant Superintendent, Gold Coast Police Force.
- Ariffin bin Long, Sergeant, Federation of Malaya Police Force.
- Arsat, Sergeant-Major, Sarawak Constabulary.
- Arthur Owen Bather, Senior Superintendent, Gold Coast Police Force.
- Edward Godwin Beckley, Inspector, Gold Coast Police Force.
- Theodore Kenneth Belton, Deputy-Superintendent, Federation of Malaya Police Force.
- Makau Bmuta, Inspector, Kenya Police Force.
- Thomas Fordham Brown, Assistant Superintendent, Singapore Police Force.
- Dahir Caine, Inspector, Kenya Police Force.
- Barry AlfredHarvey Cartwright, Senior Superintendent, Nigeria Police Force.
- Chan Heng Kooi, Inspector, Federation of Malaya Police Force.
- Richard Gibbon Chater, Chief Inspector, Kenya Police Reserve.
- Chembee bin Mohammed Zain, Sergeant Major, Federation of Malaya Police Force.
- Caution Chiluba, Detective Inspector, Northern Rhodesia Police Force.
- Alfred Ross Collett, Superintendent, Northern Rhodesia Police Force.
- Frederick Charles Constant, Assistant Superintendent, Kenya Police Force.
- Richard Joseph Wanchope Craig, MC, Deputy Superintendent, Federation of Malaya Police Force.
- Ivor Wynne Yorke-Davies, Chief Inspector, Kenya Police Reserve.
- Arthur Leonard Davis, Acting Assistant Commissioner, Tanganyika Police Force.
- John Richard Cheatle Davis, BEM, Assistant Superintendent, Kenya Police Reserve.
- Mohamed Din s/o Sheik Ahmad, Sergeant, Federation of Malaya Police Force.
- Elias bin Omar, Sergeant, Federation of Malaya Police Force.
- Joseph Etiu, Corporal, Uganda Police Force.
- Jean Riccard Factotum, Constable, Mauritius Police Force.
- Ali Faik, Sergeant, Cyprus Police Force.
- Ebenezer Mibiawogorme Gborsongu, Inspector, Gold Coast Police Force.
- Alexander Lundie Gordon, Superintendent, Hong Kong Police Force.
- Yakubu Grunshie, Sergeant-Major, Gold Coast Police Force.
- Hamid bin Abdullah, Sub-Inspector, Federation of Malaya Police Force.
- Basil St.John Hickman, Deputy Superintendent, Singapore Police Force.
- Hitam bin Abdul Talib, Corporal, Federation of Malaya Police Force.
- Donald William Howell, Honorary Assistant Superintendent, Federation of Malaya Police Volunteer Reserve.
- John Kenneth Humphreys, Assistant Superintendent, Nyasaland Police Force.
- Alfred Ikechebelu, Sergeant-Major, Nigeria Police Force.
- Mohamed Isa bin Ja'aniat, Inspector, Federation of Malaya Special Constabulary.
- Issa s/o Mohanied, Sergeant-Major, Tanganyika Police Force.
- Jalaluddin bin Abu Bakar, Detective Sub Inspector, Federation of Malaya Police Force.
- Johari bin Sakun, Corporal, Federation of Malaya Police Force.
- Michael Kanu, Sergeant, Nigeria Police Force.
- Patrick John Kenny, Superintendent, Kenya Police Force.
- Harped Abdul Karim Khan, Assistant Superintendent, Aden Police Force.
- George Arthur Kirwan, Superintendent, Nigeria Police Force.
- Koh Lian Wah, Inspector, Singapore Police Force.
- Leong Wan Sang, Inspector, Federation of Malaya Police Force.
- Oswald Lewis, Assistant Superintendent, Singapore Police Force.
- George McGarry, Deputy Superintendent, Nigeria Police Force.
- Mahat bin Haji Noor, Sergeant-Major, Federation of Malaya Police Force.
- Campbell Alleyne Mahon, Superintendent, Jamaica Constabulary.
- Salim Malelemba, Sergeant, Zanzibar Police Force.
- Abdul Manap bin Abu, Staff Sergeant, Singapore Police Force.
- Leon Marcel, Constable, Mauritius Police Force.
- Reginald David Milne, Senior Superintendent, Nigeria Police Force.
- Mohamed (bin All, Sergeant-Major, Zanzibar Police Force.
- Mohamed bin Jemain, Sergeant-Major, Federation of Malaya Police Force.
- James Vincent Mulligan, Superintendent, Kenya Police Force.
- Kiema Munyalo, Assistant Inspector, Kenya Police Force.
- Bmirio Musoke, Head Constable-Major, Uganda Police Force.
- Cyril Frank Norton, Acting Superintendent, Northern Rhodesia Police Force.
- Philip Shokare Obor, Chief Inspector, Nigeria Police, Force.
- Yosefu Okwal s/o Rasan, Head Constable, Uganda Police Force.
- Omar bin Hassan, Sergeant-Major, Federation of Malaya Police Force.
- Apostolos Papaconstantinou, Chief Inspector, Cyprus Police Force.
- Ernest Robert Pierre, Inspector, Trinidad Police Force.
- Shuk Deo Prasad, Detective Sub-Inspector, Singapore Police Force.
- Joseph Wrench Prosper, Inspector, Leeward Islands Police Force.
- Apputhurai Ananda Rajah, Deputy Superintendent, Singapore Police Force.
- Ponniah Rajaratnam, Assistant Superintendent, Singapore Police Force.
- Basoodeo Ramessur, Sub-Inspector, Mauritius Police Force.
- Thomas William Sackey, Assistant Superintendent, Gold Coast Police Force.
- Safai bin Alwi, Corporal, Federation of Malaya Special Constabulary.
- Morroh Sanneh, Station Sergeant, Gambia Police Force.
- Ernest Arnold Siebs, Inspector, British Guiana Police Force.
- Edward James Stewart, Chief Inspector, Hong Kong Police Force.
- Noorul Haq Sufaarali, Sergeant, North Borneo Constabulary.
- John Mathew Sullivan, Senior Superintendent, Uganda Police Force.
- Michael William Turner, Commandant, Hong Kong Special Constabulary.
- Arthur Albert Waters, Lieutenant, Federation of Malaya Police Force.
- Roland Terence Mytton Watson, Chief Inspector, Kenya Police Reserve.
- John Maurice Cahill Wheeler, Deputy Superintendent, Federation of Malaya Police Force.
- Francis Spencer Wigley, Superintendent, Fiji Police Force.
- Yahaya bin Ahmad, Sergeant, Federation of Malaya Special Constabulary.
- Yau So, Sergeant, Hong Kong, Police Force.

== Australia ==
=== Knight Bachelor ===
- Harold George Alderson, MBE, of Sydney. For services to amateur sport.
- Edward Ritchie Knox, MC, of Bellevue Hill, New South Wales. For services to commerce and industry.
- Ernest Daryl Lindsay, of South Yarra, Victoria. For services to art.
- Frank Samuel Tait, of Toorak, Victoria. For services to the theatre.

=== Order of the Bath ===
==== Companion of the Order of the Bath (CB) ====
Military Division

- Lieutenant-General Eric Winslow Woodward, CBE, DSO (2/9), Australian Staff Corps.

=== Order of Saint Michael and Saint George ===
==== Knight Commander of the Order of St Michael and St George (KCMG) ====
- The Honourable Kenneth Whistler Street, Chief Justice of the Supreme Court of New South Wales. For public services to the Commonwealth of Australia.

==== Companion of the Order of St Michael and St George (CMG) ====
- Rabbi Jacob Danglow, OBE, VD, of St. Kilda, Victoria. For services to the community in Australia.
- David Roy McCaughey, of Narrandera, New South Wales. For services to the pastoral industry in Australia.
- Ronald James Samuel Muir, of East Brisbane. For services to the sugar industry in Australia.

=== Order of the British Empire ===
==== Knight Commander of the Order of the British Empire (KBE) ====
Civil Division

- Lieutenant-General William Bridgeford, CB, CBE, MC, of Melbourne, Chief Executive Officer, XVI Olympiad, since 1953.
- Ivan Nello Holyman, MC, of Toorak, Victoria. For his contribution to transportation.

==== Commander of the Order of the British Empire (CBE) ====
Military Division

- Commodore James Cairns Morrow, DSO, DSC, Royal Australian Navy.
- Brigadier Lawrence George Canet, OBE, ADC (3/42), Australian Staff Corps.
- Group Captain William Norman Gibson, DFC, Royal Australian Air Force.

Civil Division

- Alfred George Brown, MC, of Kew, Victoria. For services to the Red Cross.
- Edwin William Hicks, of Elsternwick, Victoria, Secretary, Department of Air.
- John Silvester Hutcheon, QC, of Albion, Queensland. For services to cricket.
- Sydney Smith, OBE, of Chatswood, New South Wales. For services to cricket.
- Brigadier Charles Chambers Fowell Spry, DSO, of Toorak, Victoria. For distinguished public service.
- George Gribbon Sutcliffe, of Canberra. For distinguished public service.
- Edward Ronald Walker, Australian Permanent Representative to the United Nations. For distinguished public services.

==== Officer of the Order of the British Empire (OBE) ====
Military Division

- Acting Captain James Kenneth Walton, Royal Australian Navy.
- Colonel Charles Victor Anderson, ED (3/37577), Royal Australian Army Ordnance Corps.
- Colonel John Matthew Dwyer, ED (4/35213), Royal Australian Army Medical Corps.
- Lieutenant-Colonel Ralph Treyelyan Eldridge (3/164), Australian Staff Corps.
- Lieutenant-Colonel Guy Henry Fawcett (4/19), Australian Staff Corps.
- Wing Commander Reginald Bruce Burrage, DFC (0365), Royal Australian Air Force.
- Wing Commander Percy Stuart Kennedy (03441), Royal Australian Air Force.

Civil Division

- John Harold Ahearn, of Port Moresby, New Guinea. For community services in New Guinea.
- James Clarence Archer, of Canberra. For outstanding public service.
- Robert William McGregor Boswel, of Salisbury, South Australia. For outstanding public service in the guided weapons field.
- Brigadier Athol Earle Brown, of Toorak, Victoria, Secretary-General, Anzac Agency, Imperial War Graves Commission.
- The Reverend Canon Ernest Richard Buhner Gribble, of Palm Island, Queensland. For services to aboriginal missions.
- Patrick Joseph Hannaberry, of Melbourne. For conspicuous public service.
- William Rayner Hebblewhite, of Middle Cove, New South Wales, General Secretary of the Standards Association, 1924–1953.
- Francis Patrick Joseph Kelly, of Ivanhoe, Victoria. For valuable public service.
- The Reverend Sydney Alexander Mcdonald, MBE, of Chatswood, New South Wales. For social welfare services.
- Beryl McFadyen, of Sydney. For services to children of deceased servicemen.
- Councillor Roy Sydney Tyson Matthews, MC, of Hay, New South Wales. For services to the community.
- Ernest John Pitchford, of Launceston, Tasmania. For service to public and political affairs in Tasmania.
- Edith Mary Royle, of Mosman, New South Wales. For public services.
- Alice Thorburn, Matron, European Hospital, Port Moresby, New Guinea. For services to nursing.
- Ella Agnes Westwood, of Kirribilli, New South Wales. For services to the community.
- Rupert John Williams, of Launceston, Tasmania. For contribution to Journalism.
- Reginald Benjamin Williamson, of Dale River, via Beverley, Western Australia. For services to the meat industry.

==== Member of the Order of the British Empire (MBE) ====
Military Division

- Lieutenant-Commander Elford Bartlett Hopkins, VRD, Royal Australian Naval Reserve.
- Senior Commissioned Boatswain Alfred Joseph Hayter, Royal Australian Naval Volunteer Reserve.
- Captain Mostyn Reginald Beaglehole (4/20975), Royal Australian Infantry Corps.
- Captain (Quartermaster) David Allan Danson (3/294), Royal Australian Infantry Corps.
- Captain Joseph Alexander George Davey (3/37692), Royal Australian Army Ordnance Corps.
- Major (temporary) Frederick Bruce Haigh (1/18351), Royal Australian Engineers.
- Captain (temporary) Harold Ernest McHenry (3/92529), Royal Australian Infantry Corps.
- Major Brenden Stanislaus Savage (2/380), Australian Staff Corps.
- Major John Anthony Springhall (2/79011), Royal Australian Infantry Corps.
- Captain Frederick Browning Wood (3/40017), Australian Staff Corps.
- Squadron Leader William Carlyle Keritz (033150), Royal Australian Air Force.
- Squadron Leader James Waller White (03532), Royal Australian Air Force.
- Warrant Officer Frank Henry Mobberley (A3726), Royal Australian Air Force.

Civil Division

- Clarice Kathleen Andrews, JP, of Sydney. For service to war veterans.
- John William Joseph Byrne, of Sydney. For public service.
- Kathleen Coffey, of Melbourne. For public service.
- Reginald Michael Collins, of Melbourne. For honorary services to personnel of the Royal Australian Navy.
- Reginald Joseph Coombe of Adelaide. For social welfare services.
- Muriel Alice Ebeling, of Melbourne. For charitable work.
- Mary Ruth Flockart, of Melbourne. For services to music.
- Florence May Grant, of Sydney. For public service .
- The Reverend John Hope, of Sydney. For community service.
- Thomas Francis Hourigan of Melbourne. For public service in the Navy Department.
- The Reverend Thomas Edward Jones, of Sydney. For services to the people of the outback.
- Walter Geoffrey Jones of Swansea, New South Wales. For community service.
- Walter Cliye Kynaston of Cairns. For community service.
- Jean McGregor-Lowndes, JP, of Toowong, Queensland, For social welfare services.
- Doris Irene Magee, of Sydney. For services to women's amateur athletics and social welfare.
- Ernest Andrew Park JP, of Northbridge, New South Wales. For social welfare services.
- Agnes Purcell, of Melbourne. For charitable work.
- Annie Simpson Wise, of Sydney. For services to the Red Cross.
- Alfred Ernest Young of Melbourne. For service to ex-servicemen.

=== Companion of the Imperial Service Order (ISO) ===
Australian Civil Service

- Frank Gerald Cummins of Melbourne, Deputy Secretary, Department of the Navy.

=== British Empire Medal (BEM) ===
Military Division

- Chief Petty Officer Phillip Reginald Herington, 21906, Royal Australian Navy.
- Warrant Officer Class II (temporary) Douglas Hubert Bell (2/720), Royal Australian Engineers.
- Sergeant John Patrick Hevey (3745113), Royal Australian Army Service Corps.
- Warrant Officer Class II (temporary) Edward Walter Jackson (2/62270), Royal Australian Infantry Corps.
- Staff-Sergeant Alan Texas King (3/2019), Royal Australian Army Dental Corps.
- Warrant Officer Class II (provisional) Keith Leslie Reeve (3/4337), Royal Australian Engineers.
- Staff-Sergeant William Alfred Sawyer (5/9023), Royal Australian Infantry Corps.
- A.3125.8 Flight Sergeant Stanley Walter Roe, Royal Australian Air Force.

Civil Division

- Kathleen Mary Rourke, Supervisor, Telephone Branch, Postmaster General's Department, Victoria.
- Squire Lancelot Williams, Principal Attendant, Department of Defence, Melbourne.

=== Royal Red Cross (RRC) ===
==== Associate of the Royal Red Cross (ARRC) ====
- Captain Margaret Grace Caterson (F2/3), Royal Australian Army Nursing Corps.

=== Air Force Cross (AFC) ===
- Squadron Leader David Victor Hahn (05874), Royal Australian Air Force.
- Flight Lieutenant Charles Alexander Voces (03482), Royal Australian Air Force.

== See also ==
- 1956 Birthday Honours (New Zealand)
