= List of Rowthers =

This is a list of notable persons of the Rowthers, a prominent Muslim community from the peninsular states of Tamil Nadu and Kerala.

== Historical people ==
- Vavar – Warrior & Sufi
- Peer Mohammed Dargah – Sufi philosopher

== Zamindars and Mirasdars ==
- M. K. M. Abdul Salam Rowther – Mirasidar, Tiruchirappalli

== Economy ==
- Kajamian Rowther – Indian businessman and philanthropist.
- M. K. Mackar Pillay – Indian Industrialist and philanthropist
- M. M. Abdul Hameed – Indian Industrialist

== Politics ==
- M. Muhammad Ismail – "Quaid-e-Millat" ("the Leader of the Nation") freedom fighter and founder of IUML
- P. Khalifulla Sahib – politician and Dewan of Pudukkottai State in (1941-1947)
- Karim Ghani – politician in Southeast Asia of Indian origin. Before the Second World War Karim Ghani was a parliamentary secretary in Burma under Dr. Ba Maw
- K. T. M. Ahmed Ibrahim – Indian politician
- M. K. Mackar Pillay – Politician who served in the Sree Moolam Popular Assembly
- A.A. Rahim – Indian politician, freedom fighter, and union minister. The government run District Hospital of Kollam district was renamed after him in commemoration.
- K. S. G. Haja Shareef – Indian politician and industrialist
- A. K. A. Abdul Samad – Siraj-ul-Millat politician and leader of IUML
- K. M. Kader Mohideen – National president of IUML
- M. K. M. Abdul Salam Rowther – Indian politician and parliamentarian from Tiruchirappalli in 1957.
- Nagore E. M. Hanifa – singer and politician
- Samsudeen – Indian politician
- M. Gulam Mohideen Rowther – Indian politician, parliamentarian from Dindigal in 1957.
- S. M. Muhammed Sheriff – Indian politician and former parliamentarian from Tamil Nadu
- E. S. M. Packeer Mohamed – Legislator (1980–84) and parliamentarian in 1989 from Mayiladuthurai
- Y. S. M. Yusuf – former Minister of Public Work Department, Irrigation department and Chairman of Wakf board of Tamil Nadu
- S. J. Sadiq Pasha – Indian politician, Former Minister of Tamil Nadu from 1967 to 1976 and from 1989 to 1991, Treasurer of DMK Party in 1977 - 1994.
- S. Nagoor Meeran – Former ADMK Tourism and Rural industries in Tamilnadu
- M. Abdul Lathief – Indian politician
- A. Rahman Khan – Indian politician
- J. M. Aaroon Rashid – Indian politician
- T. P. M. Mohideen Khan – Former Minister for Environment in Tamil Nadu
- S. N. M. Ubayadullah – Indian politician
- K. E. Ismail – Former Minister for Revenue, Government of Kerala
- M. A. Khaleelur Rahman – Indian politician
- A. Shahul Hameed – Indian politician
- S. P. M. Syed Khan – Indian politician
- S. S. Mohammad Ismail – Indian politician
- M. M. A. Razak – Indian politician
- A. Anwhar Raajhaa – Indian politician
- S. M. Nasar – Indian politician
- Kani K. Navas – Parliamentarian from Ramanathapuram

== Academia, science and medicine ==
- E. A. Siddiq – Indian Agricultural Scientist, Padma Shri recipient
- M. A. Aleem – Indian neurologist
- P. K. Abdul Aziz – scientist in ecology and biodiversity
- Dr Salim Yusuf – cardiologist, former World Heart Federation President, Rhodes scholar, Honour of Canada recipient
- Dr Hafeez Rahman – Consultant Gynaecologist & Laparoscopic Surgeon
- Nigar Shaji – Indian space scientist

== Literature ==
- Umaru Pulavar (1642-1703) – Tamil poet
- Kunangudi Mastan Sahib (1792-1838) – Tamil Qadiriyya Sufi poet.
- Gulam Kadir Navalar – 19th century Tamil poet
- P. Dawood Shah – Tamil poet in Madurai Tamil Sangam, freedom fighter and he started Darul Islam magazine in 1919
- Abdul Jabbar – Tamil Writer and Novelist
- Ka. Mu. Sheriff – Tamil writer and poet
- Mu. Metha – Tamil poet and song writer
- Nooranad Haneef – Malayalam author
- Syed Thajudeen – Malaysian painter
- Rajathi Salma – Tamil writer & activist
- Manushyaputhiran – Tamil poet and writer
- Myna Umaiban –Malayalam Writer

== Arts ==
- Abdul Kalam Azad – Indian photographer
- Afsal – Indian film singer
- Ajmal Ameer – Indian actor and former physician
- Ameer Sultan – Actor, film director, film producer and screenwriter
- Anwar Rasheed – Film director and producer
- Asif Ali – Indian actor and film producer
- Askar Ali – Indian actor
- Bobby Kottarakkara – Indian actor
- Chitti Babu – Indian actor
- Editor Mohan – Film editor and producer
- Fahadh Faasil – Indian actor and film producer
- Farhaan Faasil – Indian actor
- Farook Abdul Rahiman – Indian filmmaker and writer
- Fazil – Indian film director
- Hakim Rawther – Indian actor and filmmaker in Mollywood
- Hesham Abdul Wahab – Indian music composer
- Ibrahim Rowther – Tamil film producer
- Irfan – Indian actor
- Ka. Mu. Sheriff – Tamil song writer
- Kombai Anwar – Tamil documentary filmmaker
- Kottayam Nazeer – Indian Actor and Impressionist
- Liaquat Ali Khan – Indian director and screenwriter
- M. K. Mustafa – Indian actor
- Mansoor Ali Khan – Indian actor and politician
- Mu. Metha – Tamil song writer
- Nazriya Nazim – Indian actress and film producer
- Nizam Rawther – Indian scriptwriter and filmmaker
- Pattanam Rasheed – Indian make-up artist
- Prem Nawas – Indian film Actor
- Prem Nazir – Indian actor
- Rafi–Mecartin – Screenwriter and director
- Rahman – Indian actor
- Raja Mohammad – Indian film editor
- Shaam – Indian actor
- Shafi – Indian film director
- Shanawas – Indian actor
- Siddique – Indian actor
- Siddique – Indian film director
- Soubin Shahir – Indian actor
- V. Z. Durai – Indian film director

== See also ==
- Tamil Muslim
