= List of Tamil Muslims =

This is a list of Tamil Muslims worldwide.

== Historical personalities ==
- Vavar
- Tun Ali of Malacca
- Tun Mutahir of Malacca
- Tun Fatimah Queen of Malacca Sultanate
- Maruthanayagam Pillai
- Bawa Muhaiyaddeen, Sufi mystic

== Economy ==
- Mecca Rafeeque Ahmed - entrepreneur, recipient of 2011 Padma Shri Award
- B. S. Abdur Rahman - (1927 – 2015) entrepreneur, philanthropist and educationist.
- Kajamian Rowther – entrepreneur and philanthropist

== Politics and law ==
=== Politicians ===
- K. A. M. Muhammed Abubacker (born 1971) - Legislative Party Leader of the Indian Union Muslim League from 2016 to 2021.
- A. Aslam Basha (1968 -2020) - member of the 14th Tamil Nadu Legislative Assembly
- M. H. Jawahirullah - (born 1959) - member of Tamil Nadu Legislative Assembly 2021 and founding member/leader of the Manithaneya Makkal Katchi party
- T. P. M. Mohideen Khan (born 1947) - former minister for environment in the Tamil Nadu Legislative Assembly
- S. M. Abdul Majid - minister for local administration in Kamaraj cabinet between 1962 and 1963
- K. S. Masthan (born 1955) - MLA from 2016 and Minister from 2021
- K. M. Kader Mohideen (born 1940) - current National President, Indian Union Muslim League, former Lok Sabha member 2004-2009
- Kani K. Navas (born 1979) - Lok Sabha member for the Indian Union Muslim League 2019-to date
- S. M. Nasar - Indian Politician
- S. J. Sadiq Pasha - former Member of the Legislative Assembly of Tamil Nadu
- M. Mariam Pichai (died 2011) - appointed as minister in the 2011 Legislative Assembly election, but died on his way to the oath-swearing ceremony
- Abdul Azeez Abdul Rahim, (born 1966) - a Malaysian politician, MP since May 2013 and chairman of the Tabung Haji from 2013 to 2018.
- Abdul Rahman (born 1959) - Lok Sabha member for the Indian Union Muslim League 2009-2014
- J. M. Aaroon Rashid (born 1950) - former member of the Parliament of India, representing the Theni Lok Sabha constituency.
- A. Anwar Rhazza - former Member of the Legislative Assembly of Tamil Nadu
- M. Muhammad Ismail Sahib (1896—1972) - Founder of the Indian Union Muslim League
- P. Khalifulla Sahib - Statesman, Dewan of Pudukkottai State
- Yakub Hasan Sait (1875–1940) - served as the Minister for Public Works in the Madras presidency for the Indian Union Muslim League
- A. K. A. Abdul Samad (1926-1999) - state President of the Indian Union Muslim League
- Aloor Shanavas (born 1982) - politician, writer and social worker from Tamil Nadu. currently a Member of Tamil Nadu Legislative Assembly
- S. M. Muhammed Sheriff - elected to Lok Sabha from Periyakulam constituency as an Indian Union Muslim League candidate in 1971
- S. N. M. Ubayadullah (born 1941) - former minister for Commercial Taxes in Tamil Nadu
- Sir Mohammad Usman (1884–1960) - served as the Minister of Home for the Madras Presidency and the first Indian acting Governor of Madras
- Y. S. M. Yusuf - former MLA and former Minister of Public Work Department, Irrigation department of Tamil Nadu

=== Justices ===
- M. M. Ismail (1921-2005) - former State Governor and Chief Justice
- Basheer Ahmed Sayeed (1900-1984) - former member of the Madras Legislative Council and judge of the Madras High Court

== Science ==
- A. P. J. Abdul Kalam (1931 - 2015) - aerospace scientist and statesman who was the 11th President of India from 2002 to 2007
- Masha Nazeem (born 1993) - inventor
- Nigar Shaji - Indian space scientist
- Dr Mohamed Rela Expertise in liver transplantation and hepatopancreatobiliary (HPB) surgery.

== Literature ==
- Kombai Anwar
- Makkal Paavalar Inqulab
- Manushyaputhiran
- Thoppil Mohamed Meeran
- Mu. Metha
- Gulam Kadir Navalar
- Umaru Pulavar
- S. Abdul Rahman
- Kunangudi Masthan Sahib
- Rajathi Salma
- P. Dawood Shah
- Ka. Mu. Sheriff

== Sport ==
- Nasser Hussain OBE, the captain of the England cricket team during 1999-2003
- Syed Sabir Pasha Football

== Art ==
=== Cinema ===
- I. Ahmed
- Ameer
- Arav
- Aziz Ansari
- Arnav
- Irfan
- Sanjeev Karthick
- Amzath Khan
- Jai
- Mansoor Ali Khan
- Monica
- Nassar
- Aranthangi Nisha
- Rajkiran
- Ibrahim Rowther
- Shaam
- Halitha Shameem

=== Musicians ===
- Ghibran
- Shahul Hameed
- Nagore E. M. Hanifa
- Mu. Metha
- A. R. Rahman
- A. R. Reihana
- Shabir
- Yuvan Shankar Raja

== Criminals ==
- Haji Mastan
