= M.E.S. Ponnani College, Ponnani =

Public college in Ponnani, Kerala, India

MES Ponnani College
- എം ഇ എസ് പൊന്നാനി കോളേജ്
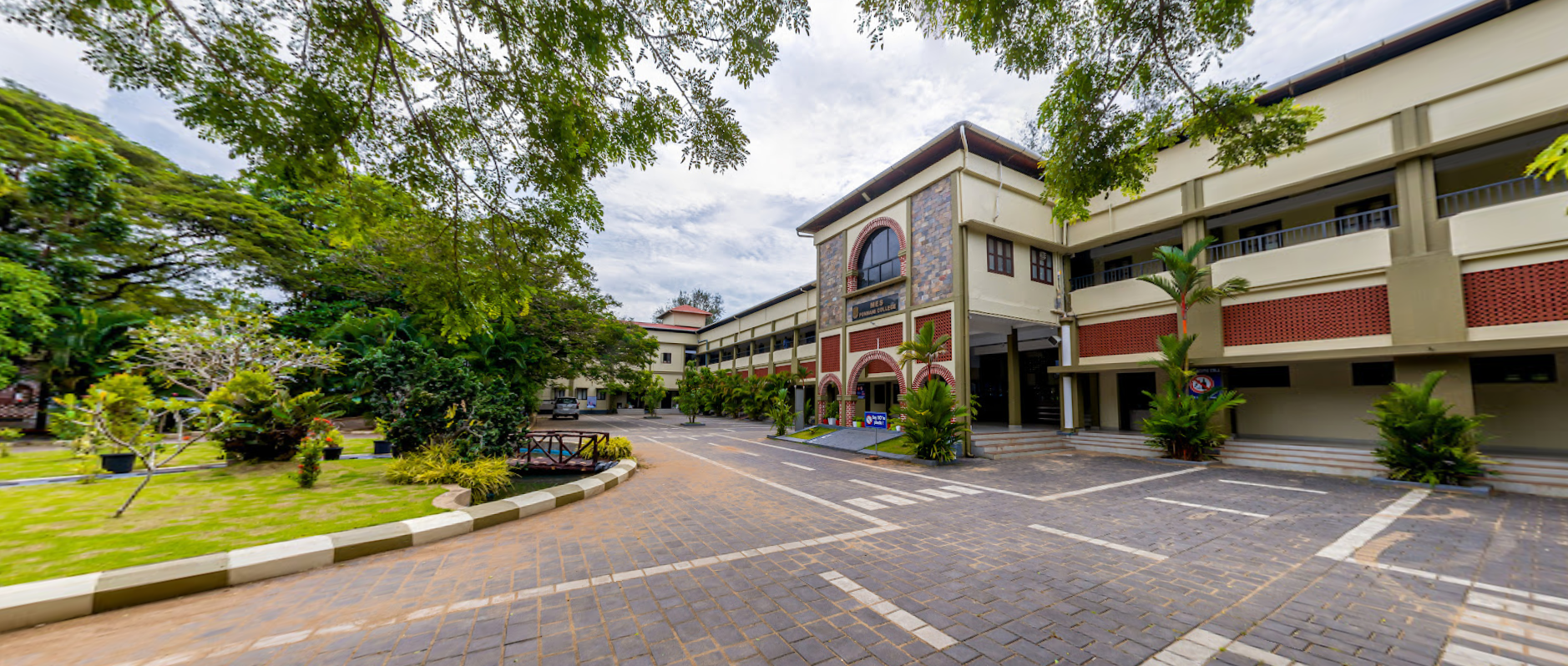
- Type: Undergraduate college Public college
- Established: 1968; 58 years ago
- Parent institution: MES
- Accreditation: National Assessment and Accreditation Council (India)
- Affiliations: University of Calicut
- Academic affiliations: University of Calicut
- Officer in charge: Dr. ANAS E.
- Principal: Dr. Anas E.
- Principal-in-Charge: Dr. Anas E.
- Academic staff: 79
- Administrative staff: 29
- Location: MES Ponnani College, Ponnani South (PO), Malappuram, Kerala, India, Pin-679586, Ponnani, Kerala, 679586, India; 10.764661°N 75.9254174°E
- Campus: Urban
- Language: English
- Website: www.mespni.ac.in
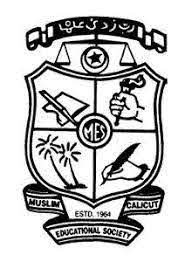

- Location within Kerala Location within India

MES Ponnani College is an arts, science and commerce college established in 1968 and run by the Muslim Educational Society located in Ponnani, in the Malappuram district of Kerala, India. It is affiliated to the Calicut University.

== History ==
The inception of a collegiate institution in Ponnani finds its origin in the cogitations of the late P. K. Abdul Gafoor, who articulated this vision during a public gathering organized by the Ponnani unit of the Muslim Educational Society in 1967. In his keynote address, he explicitly expressed the willingness of M.E.S. to establish a college in Ponnani, contingent upon the Ponnani M.E.S. units procuring the necessary land and an endowment of one hundred thousand rupees. Land covering 32 acres was secured from the government, and a sum of one hundred twenty-five thousand rupees was garnered through public contributions. Thus, in 1968, the establishment of the college under the patronage of M.E.S. President, P.K. Abdul Gafoor, alongside Sri E.K. Imbichi Bava and Sri C.H. Mohammed Koya, who then held ministerial positions in Kerala. At present, it imparts higher education to a student body exceeding 1,500 individuals, offering five postgraduate programs and ten undergraduate programs. Three of the five postgraduate departments have been designated as research centers by the University of Calicut. The college comprises a faculty of 69 teaching staff members and 25 non-teaching personnel. In November 2022, the institution received re-accreditation from the National Assessment and Accreditation Council in 3rd cycle with A+ Grade (3.46 CGPA).

== Campus ==
=== Library ===
The college library is named after E. Moidu Moulavi, a prominent freedom fighter, social reformer, scholar, and educationist from the Malabar District, born in Maranchery, Ponnani.

In its inaugural year in 1968, the library began in a classroom with 1,000 books. In 2005, an independent building was constructed using the MP fund (2002) provided by Korambayil Ahamed Haaji, a Rajya Sabha Member. This building, constructed by Nirmithi Kendra, Malappuram, spans 2,950 square feet. In 2019, it underwent further expansion, adding an additional 1,200 square feet. Currently, the library occupies a total area of over 4,000 square feet spread across two floors.

The library features a large reading area capable of accommodating up to 150 students simultaneously. The entire collection is organized according to the 22nd edition of the Dewey Decimal Classification (DDC) system and cataloged following the MARC 21 standard. In 2012, the library was automated using Book Magic software and later transitioned to the KOHA Integrated Library Management System (ILMS) open-source software in 2018. This implementation enhances the accuracy and efficiency of various library tasks, including user check-in/check-out, book issuance and return, and stock verification.

=== Departments ===
- Aqua Culture & Fishery Microbiology
- Arabic
- Botany
- Chemistry
- Commerce & Management Studies
- Computer Science
- Economics
- English
- Geology
- Hindi
- History
- Malayalam
- Mathematics
- Physical Education
- Physics
- Political Science
- Zoology

=== Laboratories ===
- Language Lab
- FIST Lab
- Petrology Lab
- Physics Lab
- Molecular Biology Lab
- UG Physics Lab
- Material Science Lab
- GIS Lab
- MSc Physics Lab

=== Research Centres ===
- Aqua Culture
- Geology
- Physics

== Clubs, Cells and Forums ==
- Bhoomithrasena Club
- Bicycle Club
- Biodiversity Club - The Biodiversity club was officially inaugurated on 27-8-2013 by Dr. Jaffer Palot, Scientist, Zoological survey of India, Calicut. Biodiversity Club was established to implement programmes to conserve biodiversity and to establish ‘Shanthisthal’, a man-made forest ecosystem in the colleges, where 30 cents was made available for making a Forest grove with RET (Rare, Endangered and Threatened) species. This protected Shanthisthal maintained by the Biodiversity Club of the college in due course of time will become a biodiversity rich area of rare and endangered plant and animal species without human hindrance.
- Debate Club
- Election Literacy Club
- Fine Arts Cell
- Green Campus Clean Campus Cell
- Health and Yoga Club
- Media & Film Club
- Music Club
- Nature Club
- Pain and Palliative Care Club
- Parliamentary Club
- Quiz Club
- Red Ribbon Club
- Tourism Club - The Tourism Club was formed with an objective of creating awareness among the students about the tourism related activities. The club enhances responsible tourism among students. Tourism club is effectively functioning in the college and the conducts talks, seminars, field trip and exhibitions.

== Location ==
Geographically situated on the western fringes of the Malappuram district, Ponnani encompasses the municipal area along the western precincts of Tippu Sultan Road. Significantly, this institution stands as the solitary center for higher education within the coastal enclave of the Malappuram district, stretching between the towns of Tirur and Guruvayoor. The presence of National Highway 66, the K.S.R.T.C. bus depot, and the private bus terminal conveniently facilitate student commutes.

== Notable alumni ==
- Padma Shri Prof. Thalappil Pradeep, professor at IIT, Chennai
- Hashim Manjebrayakath, scientist at the Indian Ministry of Earth Science
- Prof. Sajeev Krishnan, Professor, Centre for Earth Sciences, IISc, Bangalore
- Iqbal Kuttippuram, script writer
- P. P. Ramachandran, poet
- Salam Bappu, film director
- P Sudhakaran, journalist and translator
- Alankod Leela Krishnan, poet and writer

== Photo Gallery ==
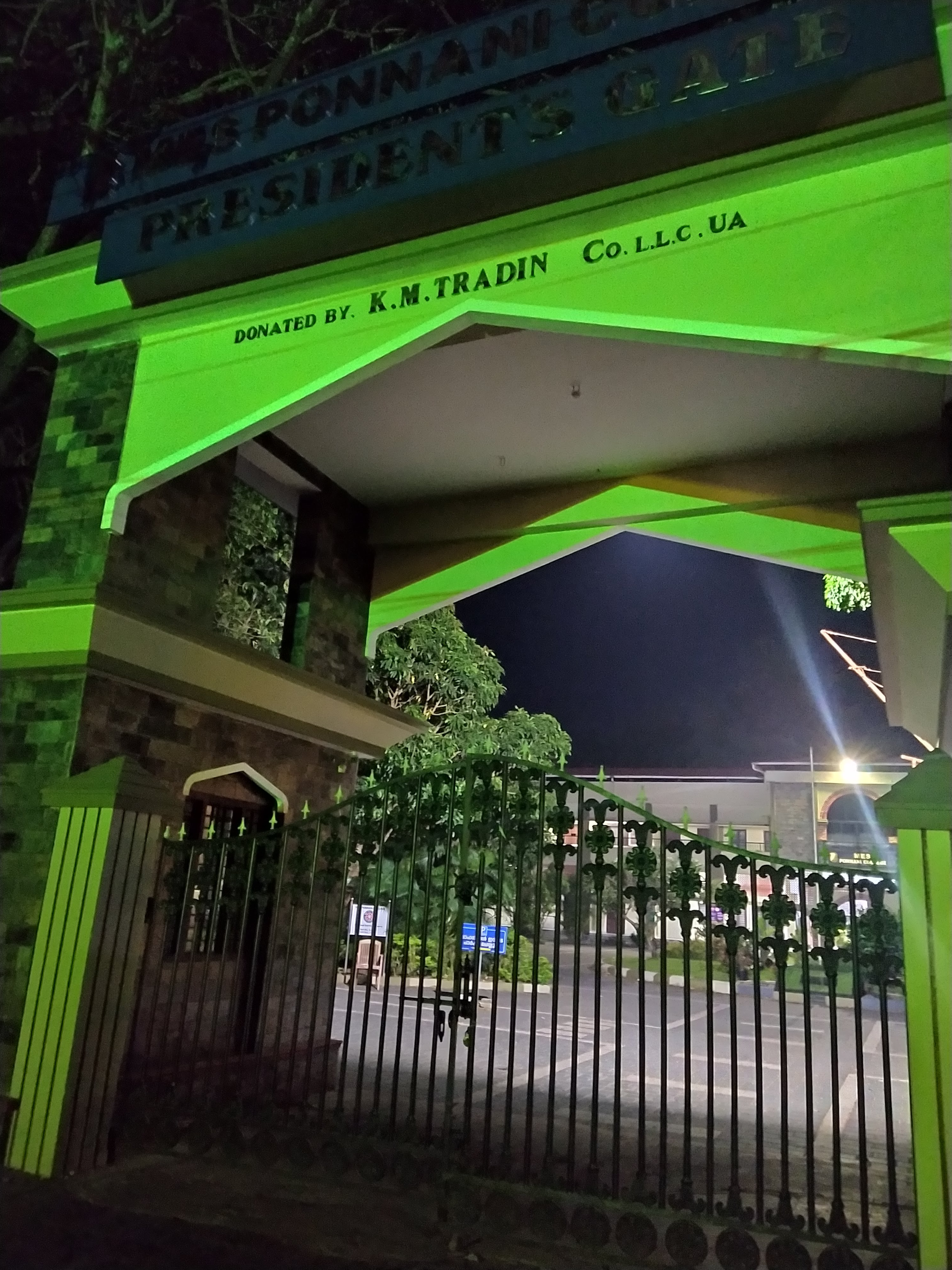
College Gate View - Night

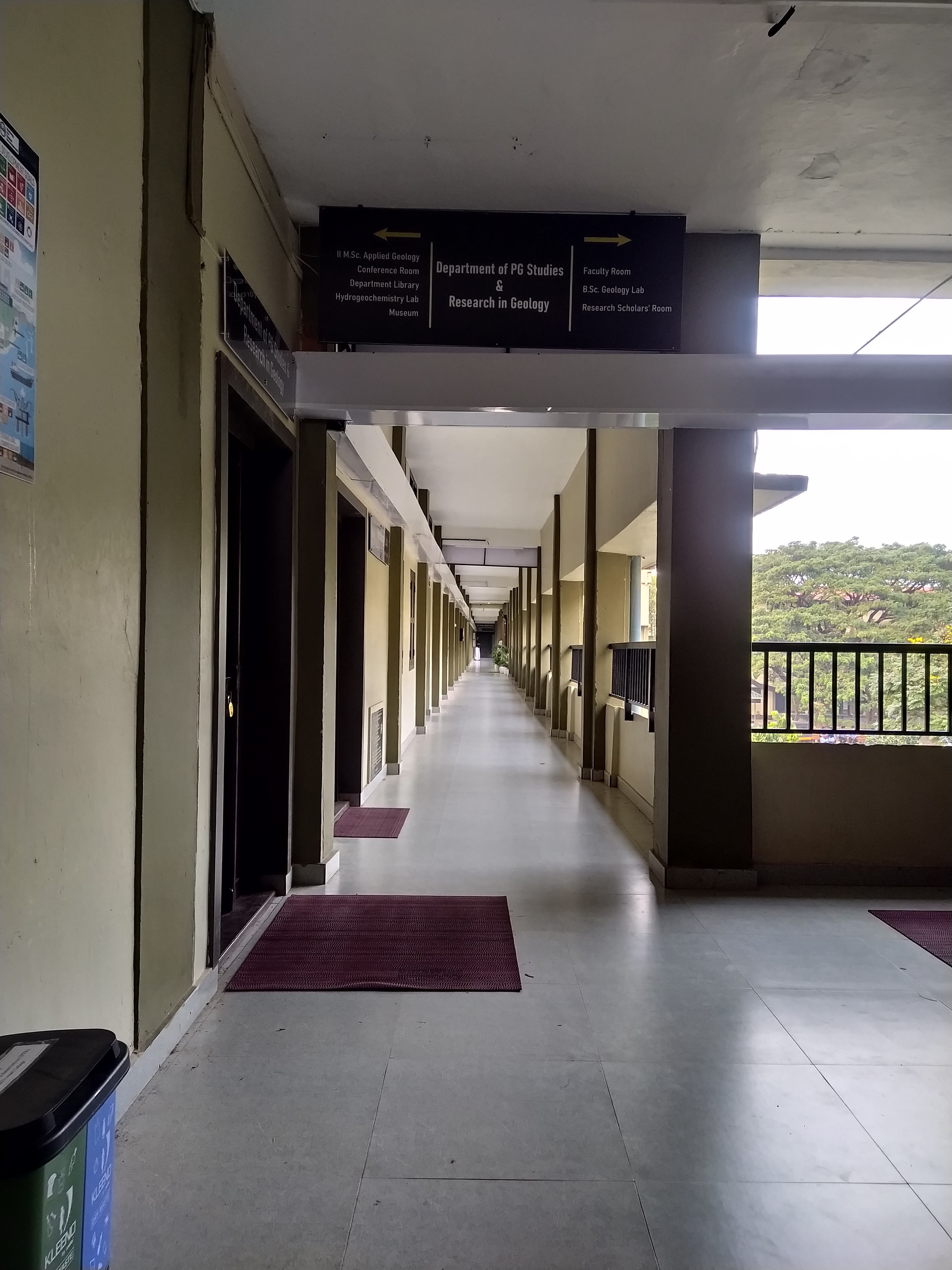
Department of PG Studies and Research in Geology, Inside to out view

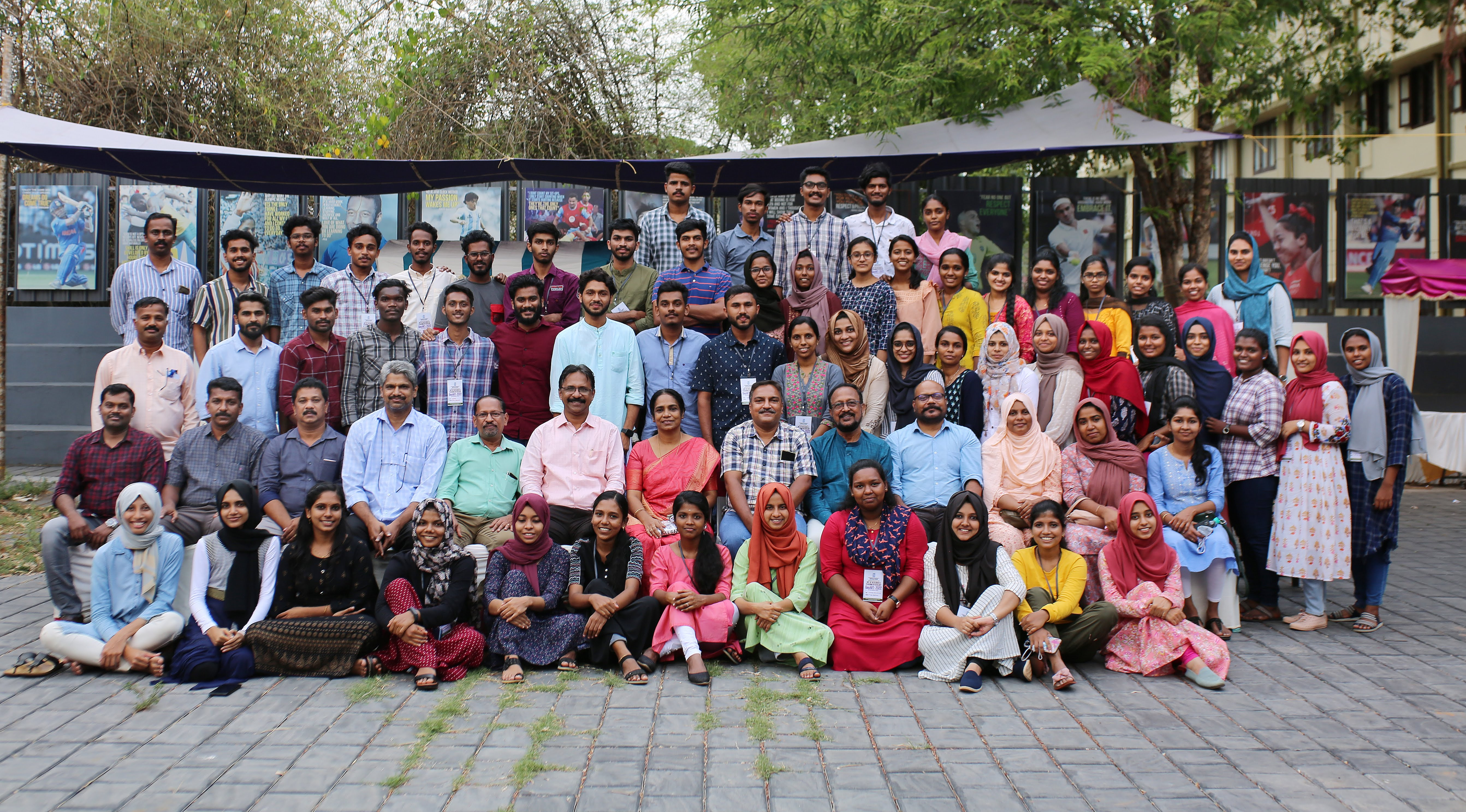
Dr. Aysha VV, Rtd. HoD, Dept. of Geology, Retirement Day group photo

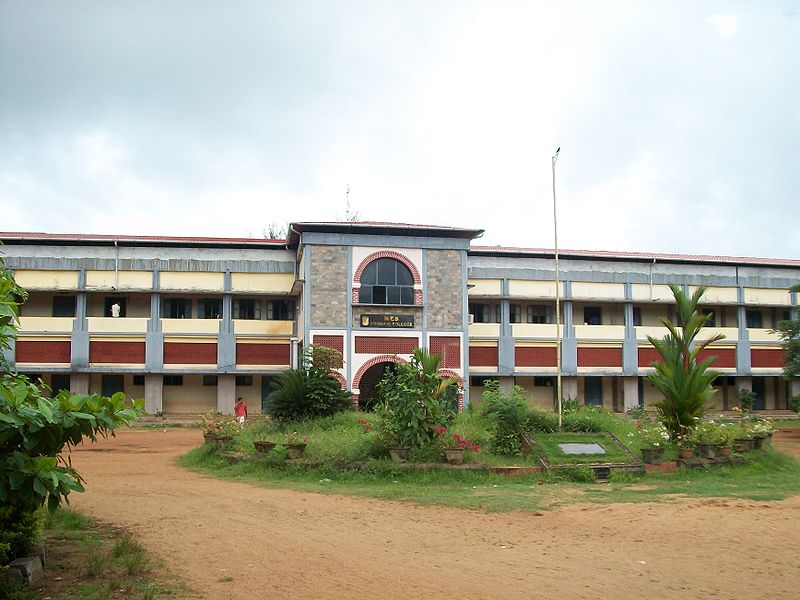
An old photo of MES College

== See also ==
- Education in India
- Education in Kerala
- List of institutions of higher education in Kerala
- List of colleges affiliated to the University of Calicut
