= K. Annamalai (disambiguation) =

K. Annamalai is an Indian politician born 1984

K. Annamalai may refer to:

- K. Annamalai (AIADMK politician) (born 1948), Indian politician
