= Kadayanallur Assembly constituency =

One of the 234 State Legislative Assembly Constituencies in Tamil Nadu, in India

Coordinates: 9.08°N 77.35°E

Kadayanallur
- Constituency No. 221 for the Tamil Nadu Legislative Assembly

Constituency details
- Country: India
- Region: South India
- State: Tamil Nadu
- Lok Sabha constituency: Tenkasi
- Established: 1967
- Total electors: 269,220

Member of Legislative Assembly
- 17th Tamil Nadu Legislative Assembly
- Incumbent T. M. Rajendran
- Party: DMK
- Elected year: 2026

Kadayanallur is a state assembly constituency in Tenkasi district in Tamil NaduMost successful political party- AIADMK. It is a part of Tenkasi Lok Sabha constituency. It is one of the 234 State Legislative Assembly Constituencies in Tamil Nadu, in India.

== Demographics ==
Gender demographics of Kadayanallur constituency as of 01.05.2021, taken ahead of the state general elections in 2021.

Year	Female	Male	Transgender	Total
2021	1,43,484	1,45,416	9	2,88,909

== Members of Legislative Assembly ==
=== Madras State ===
Year	Winner	Party
1967	A. R. Subbiah Mudaliar	Independent

=== Tamil Nadu ===
Year	Winner	Party
1971	A. R. Subbiah Mudaliar	Dravida Munnetra Kazhagam
1977	M. M. A. Razak	All India Anna Dravida Munnetra Kazhagam
1980	A. Shahul Hameed	Indian Union Muslim League
1984	T. Perumal	All India Anna Dravida Munnetra Kazhagam
1989	Samusudeen	Dravida Munnetra Kazhagam
1991	S. Nagoor Meeran	All India Anna Dravida Munnetra Kazhagam
1996	K. Naina Mohammad	Dravida Munnetra Kazhagam
2001	M. Subbiah Pandian	All India Anna Dravida Munnetra Kazhagam
2006	S. Peter Alphonse	Indian National Congress
2011	P. Chendur Pandian	All India Anna Dravida Munnetra Kazhagam
2016	K. A. M. M. Abubacker	Indian Union Muslim League
2021	C. Krishnamurali	All India Anna Dravida Munnetra Kazhagam
2026	T. M. Rajendran	Marumalarchi Dravida Munnetra Kazhagam

== Election results ==
Vote share of winning candidates
2026	35.97%
2021	43.08%
2016	37.49%
2011	49.83%
2006	44.58%
2001	45.57%
1996	46.58%
1991	56.59%
1989	36.71%
1984	53.44%
1980	50.71%
1977	38.78%
1971	52.49%
1967	49.89%

=== 2026 ===
2026 Tamil Nadu Legislative Assembly election: Kadayanallur
Party	Candidate	Votes	%	±%
DMK	T. M. Rajendran	79,832	35.97	
AIADMK	C Krishnamurali	73,579	33.15	▼9.93
TVK	R. K. Abdul Jalil	49,254	22.19	New
PT	Kavitha R	2,882	1.3	
Independent	Esakki Pandi K	576	0.26	
Independent	Murugan P	537	0.24	
NOTA	NOTA	527	0.24	
Margin of victory		6,253		
Turnout		2,21,951		
Rejected ballots				
Registered electors				
DMK gain from AIADMK		Swing		

=== 2021 ===
2021 Tamil Nadu Legislative Assembly election: Kadayanallur
Party	Candidate	Votes	%	±%
AIADMK	C. Krishnamurali	88,474	43.08	6.22
IUML	K. A. M. Muhammed Abubacker	64,125	31.22	−6.27
AMMK	S. Ayyaduraipandian	34,216	16.66	
MNM	M. Ambikadevi	1,778	0.87	
NOTA	Nota	1,056	0.51	−0.53
Independent	S. Seenivasan	938	0.46	
Independent	Velammal	672	0.33	
Independent	Sivasubramaniyan R	672	0.33	
Independent	Poologaraj R	658	0.32	
Independent	S. Muruganantham	532	0.26	
Margin of victory		24,349	11.86	11.22
Turnout		2,05,374	70.71	−0.55
Registered electors		2,90,432		
AIADMK gain from IUML		Swing	5.59	

=== 2016 ===
2016 Tamil Nadu Legislative Assembly election: Kadayanallur
Party	Candidate	Votes	%	±%
IUML	K. A. M. Muhammed Abubacker	70,763	37.49	
AIADMK	Sheik Dawood. S	69,569	36.86	−12.96
DMDK	Gothai Mariappan	15,858	8.40	
BJP	Kathirvelu. V	14,286	7.57	5.58
SDPI	Jabar Ali Usmani. J	5,993	3.18	−0.93
AIFB	Raja Maravan. S	3,581	1.90	
NOTA	None Of The Above	1,969	1.04	
PMK	Thirumalaikumarasamy. M	1,350	0.72	
TMMK	Santhana Mariappan. V	844	0.45	
Independent	Mohamed Abdul Rahman. P	812	0.43	
Margin of victory		1,194	0.63	−9.29
Turnout		1,88,737	71.26	−4.16
Registered electors		2,64,848		
IUML gain from AIADMK		Swing	-12.33	

=== 2011 ===
2011 Tamil Nadu Legislative Assembly election: Kadayanallur
Party	Candidate	Votes	%	±%
AIADMK	P. Chendur Pandian	80,794	49.83	8.82
INC	S. Peter Alphonse	64,708	39.91	−4.68
SDPI	Mohamed Mubarak . S.	6,649	4.10	
BJP	Pandi Durai R.	3,233	1.99	−0.67
Independent	Jahir Hussain . S. S	1,753	1.08	
BSP	Ramaiah . M	1,177	0.73	−4.89
Independent	Mohamed Jaffer . K	929	0.57	
Independent	Ramanathan . P	471	0.29	
Independent	Marimuthu . T	417	0.26	
Independent	Bala Subramanian . M	385	0.24	
Independent	Sankar . A	345	0.21	
Margin of victory		16,086	9.92	6.34
Turnout		2,14,997	75.42	6.90
Registered electors		1,62,155		
AIADMK gain from INC		Swing	5.24	

=== 2006 ===
2006 Tamil Nadu Legislative Assembly election: Kadayanallur
Party	Candidate	Votes	%	±%
INC	S. Peter Alphonse	53,700	44.58	
AIADMK	Kamaludeen. U. H	49,386	41.00	−4.56
PT	Arumugasamy. M	6,760	5.61	
Independent	Thiruppathy. V. S.	3,229	2.68	
BJP	Shanmugavelu. M	3,203	2.66	
SP	Raj @ Shanmugaraj	1,372	1.14	
Independent	Magdoom	1,196	0.99	
Independent	Pandian. P. S	1,110	0.92	
Independent	Senthil Raj. V.	490	0.41	
Margin of victory		4,314	3.58	2.41
Turnout		1,20,446	68.52	7.86
Registered electors		1,75,786		
INC gain from AIADMK		Swing	-0.98	

=== 2001 ===
2001 Tamil Nadu Legislative Assembly election: Kadayanallur
Party	Candidate	Votes	%	±%
AIADMK	M. Subbiah Pandian	48,220	45.57	14.65
DMK	Shahul P. M.	46,976	44.39	−2.19
MDMK	Pandara Mudaliar. S.	7,360	6.96	−8.00
Independent	Bathusah M.	1,571	1.48	
Independent	Saied Magthume. K	918	0.87	
Independent	Hamardin . V. S.	409	0.39	
Independent	Abdul Kadar. R.	368	0.35	
Margin of victory		1,244	1.18	−14.49
Turnout		1,05,822	60.66	−9.75
Registered electors		1,74,540		
AIADMK gain from DMK		Swing	-1.02	

=== 1996 ===
1996 Tamil Nadu Legislative Assembly election: Kadayanallur
Party	Candidate	Votes	%	±%
DMK	K. Naina Mohammad	49,641	46.58	18.15
AIADMK	Gani. A. M.	32,949	30.92	−25.67
MDMK	Sanjeevi. M.	15,939	14.96	
PMK	Sehana. M. M.	2,342	2.20	
BJP	Murugesan. G.	2,215	2.08	−3.32
Independent	Shanmugiah Pandian. S.	1,927	1.81	
JP	Pandian. S.	253	0.24	
Independent	Subbiah Pandian. S.	198	0.19	
Independent	Paulraj. R.	106	0.10	
Independent	Velusamy. K.	104	0.10	
Independent	Esakki. S.	104	0.10	
Margin of victory		16,692	15.66	−12.50
Turnout		1,06,563	70.41	3.08
Registered electors		1,59,882		
DMK gain from AIADMK		Swing	-10.01	

=== 1991 ===
1991 Tamil Nadu Legislative Assembly election: Kadayanallur
Party	Candidate	Votes	%	±%
AIADMK	S. Nagoor Meeran	55,681	56.59	37.99
DMK	Samusudeen Alias Kathiravan	27,971	28.43	−8.28
IUML	V. S. Kamarudeen	8,215	8.35	
BJP	R. Mailerumperumal	5,316	5.40	
THMM	Selvakumar Alias I. S. S. Rajan	377	0.38	
Independent	Mydeen Pitchai	268	0.27	
Independent	T. Shahul Hameed	185	0.19	
Independent	R. Rajendran	161	0.16	
Independent	A. Mariappan	107	0.11	
Independent	S. Varisai Mohamed	56	0.06	
Independent	M. S. Esakkia Pillai Alias Durai Pillai	50	0.05	
Margin of victory		27,710	28.16	21.44
Turnout		98,387	67.33	−8.01
Registered electors		1,52,327		
AIADMK gain from DMK		Swing	19.88	

=== 1989 ===
1989 Tamil Nadu Legislative Assembly election: Kadayanallur
Party	Candidate	Votes	%	±%
DMK	Samusudeen Alias Kathiravan	37,531	36.71	−8.47
INC	Ayyadurai Alias Subramanian S. R. M	30,652	29.98	
AIADMK	Anaikutti Pandian S. P. M	19,019	18.60	−34.83
AIADMK	Abdul Razaak M. M. A. M	12,908	12.63	−40.81
Independent	Marimutu M. P. P. M	598	0.58	
Independent	Alagumuthu Thevar K. M	331	0.32	
Independent	Kannan. M. M	264	0.26	
Independent	Sampath. R. M	229	0.22	
Independent	Thirumalaivel S. K. M	217	0.21	
Independent	Shahul Hameed M. S. M	184	0.18	
Independent	Rajaiah. A. M	118	0.12	
Margin of victory		6,879	6.73	−1.53
Turnout		1,02,230	75.34	−11.67
Registered electors		1,38,368		
DMK gain from AIADMK		Swing	-16.73	

=== 1984 ===
1984 Tamil Nadu Legislative Assembly election: Kadayanallur
Party	Candidate	Votes	%	±%
AIADMK	T. Perumal	49,186	53.44	5.21
DMK	Samusudeen Alias Kathiravan	41,584	45.18	
Independent	Natrajan. A.	1,019	1.11	
Independent	Esakkia Pillai. M. S.	255	0.28	
Margin of victory		7,602	8.26	5.78
Turnout		92,044	87.01	17.57
Registered electors		1,11,405		
AIADMK gain from Independent		Swing	2.73	

=== 1980 ===
1980 Tamil Nadu Legislative Assembly election: Kadayanallur
Party	Candidate	Votes	%	±%
Independent	A. Shahul Hameed	38,225	50.71	
AIADMK	Gani A. M. Alias Mohideen Pitchai. A.	36,354	48.23	9.45
Independent	Kumaraswamy Thevar. S.	357	0.47	
Independent	Abdul Kader. S. T.	175	0.23	
Independent	Ramachandran. S.	173	0.23	
Independent	Ramanathan. P.	96	0.13	
Margin of victory		1,871	2.48	−5.00
Turnout		75,380	69.44	−1.23
Registered electors		1,10,307		
Independent gain from AIADMK		Swing	11.93	

=== 1977 ===
1977 Tamil Nadu Legislative Assembly election: Kadayanallur
Party	Candidate	Votes	%	±%
AIADMK	M. M. A. Razak	29,347	38.78	
INC	S.K.T. Ramachandran	23,686	31.30	−16.21
DMK	K.Kattari Pandian	16,329	21.58	−30.91
JP	M. Lakshmana Nadar	5,623	7.43	
Independent	Nellai Gandhi Abdul Kader	690	0.91	
Margin of victory		5,661	7.48	2.50
Turnout		75,675	70.67	−5.54
Registered electors		1,08,473		
AIADMK gain from DMK		Swing	-13.71	

=== 1971 ===
1971 Tamil Nadu Legislative Assembly election: Kadayanallur
Party	Candidate	Votes	%	±%
DMK	A. R. Subbiah Mudaliar	37,649	52.49	
INC	Abdul Majid Sahib S. M.	34,079	47.51	−1.77
Margin of victory		3,570	4.98	4.36
Turnout		71,728	76.21	−5.20
Registered electors		96,720		
DMK gain from Independent		Swing	2.60	

=== 1967 ===
1967 Madras Legislative Assembly election: Kadayanallur
Party	Candidate	Votes	%	±%
Independent	A. R. Subbiah Mudaliar	36,349	49.89	
INC	S. M. A. Majid	35,903	49.28	
ABJS	S. R. Naicker	603	0.83	
Margin of victory		446	0.61	
Turnout		72,855	81.41	
Registered electors		91,875		
Independent win (new seat)				
