= M. M. Abdul Hameed =

Indian industrialist

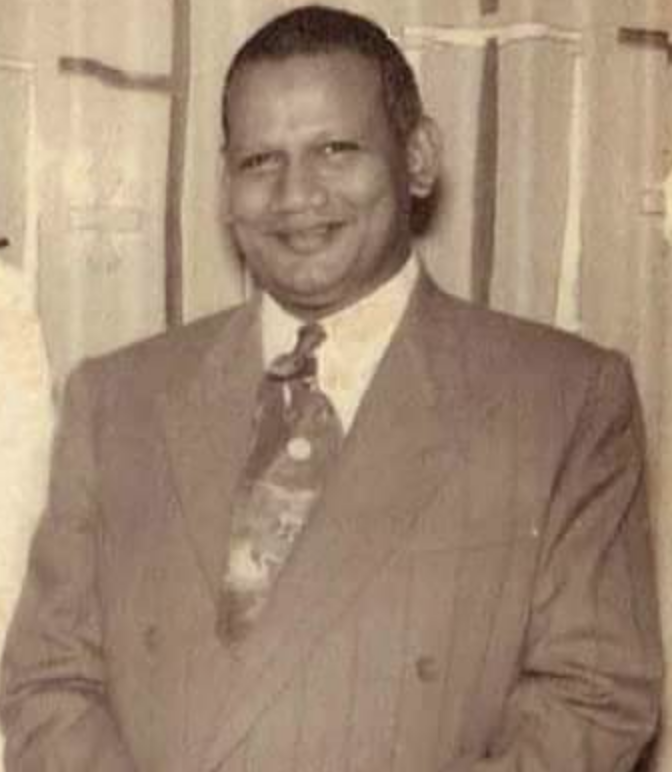
- Born: 2 November 1914; Alwaye, Madras Presidency, British India
- Died: 4 September 1971 (aged 56); Alwaye, Kerala, India
- Other names: Hameed Pillay
- Occupations: Industrialist; Philanthropist; Exporter
- Spouse: A. A. Amina Umma
- Children: 9
- Parents: M. K. Mackar Pillay (father); Ishumma Tharackandathil (mother)

Manadath Mackar Pillay Abdul Hameed (2 November 1914 – 4 September 1971) was an Indian industrialist, banker, and philanthropist. He was a leading cashew and lemongrass exporter, and an early supporter and patron of the Muslim Educational Society, which was founded by his son-in-law P. K. Abdul Gafoor.

Hameed also served as the managing director of the Bank of Alwaye, Alwaye Municipality's primary financial institution, before it was merged into the State Bank of Travancore in 1965.

== Biography ==
Abdul Hameed was born to M. K. Mackar Pillay, a prominent Aluva industrialist and politician, as the second of three sons.

In 1935, Hameed became a partner of M. K. Mackar Pillay & Sons, one of the largest trading firms in the Kingdom of Travancore. The company was the first to challenge the monopoly of British trading firms in the Malabar coast by directly exporting essential oils. When the firm was incorporated as Mackar Pillay & Sons Limited in 1941, Hameed became managing director.
