= M. K. Mackar Pillay =

Indian industrialist (1880–1966)

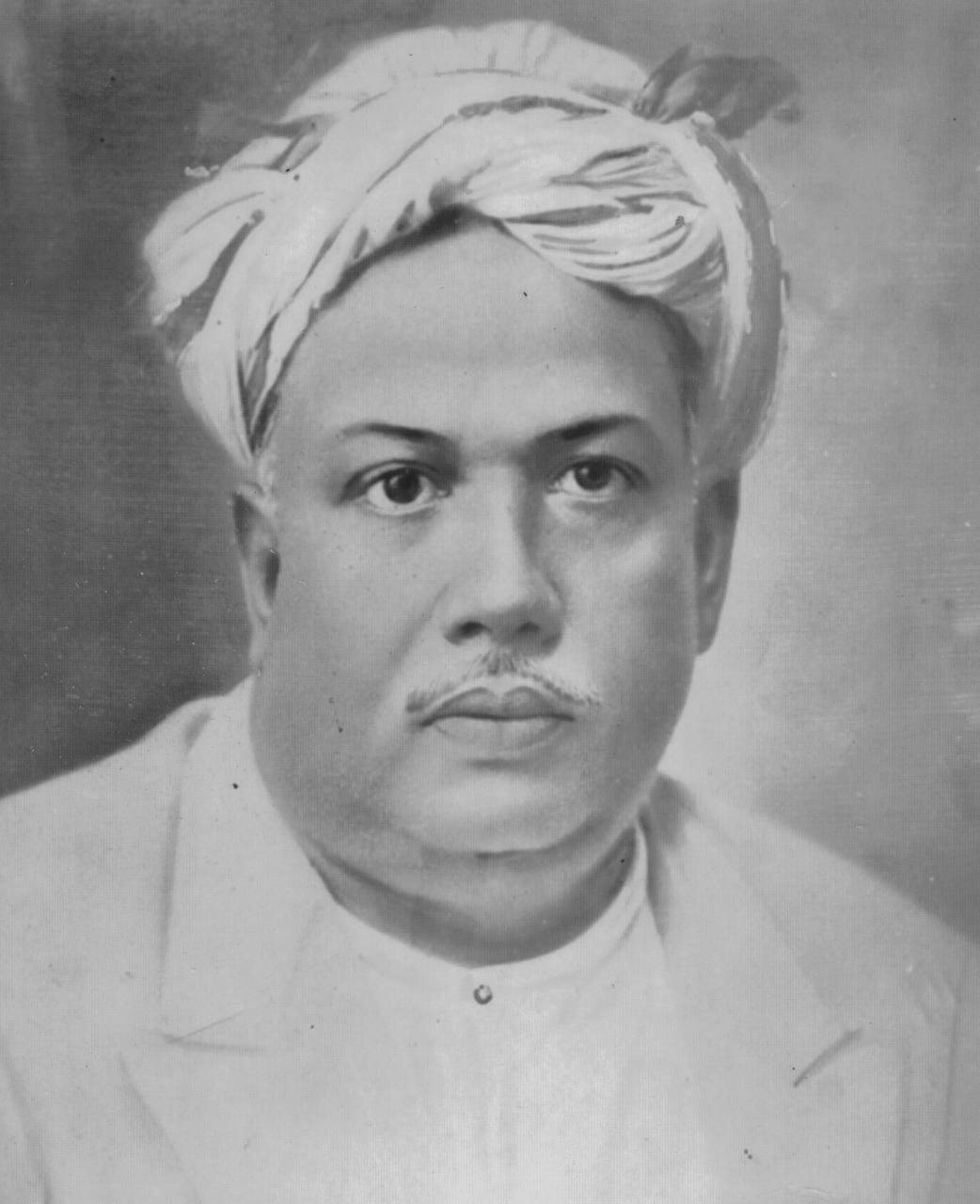

Member of the Sree Moolam Popular Assembly
- In office 1936–1947
- Nominated by: C. P. Ramaswami Iyer
- Constituency: Alwaye; Perumbavoor

Personal details
- Born: 1880 Alwaye, Madras Presidency, British India
- Died: 19 May 1966 (aged 85–86) Alwaye, Kerala, India
- Spouse(s): Ishumma Tharackandathil; Amina Tharackandathil
- Children: 17, including M. M. Abdul Hameed
- Relatives: M. K. Khader Pillay (brother)
- Occupation: Agriculturalist; Exporter; Politician

Manadath Kunju Mackar Pillay (1880 – 1966) was an Indian industrialist, banker, philanthropist, and politician who served in the Sree Moolam Popular Assembly. He was a leading cashew and lemongrass exporter, and founder of the eponymous Mackar Pillay and Sons Limited.

Pillay was the promoter of the Bank of Alwaye, Alwaye Municipality's primary financial institution, before it was merged into the State Bank of Travancore in 1965.

== Biography ==
Mackar Pillay was born to Manadath Kunju, an Aluva agriculturalist and trader, as the second of three sons.

In 1941, Pillay founded Mackar Pillay & Sons, one of the largest trading firms in the Kingdom of Travancore. The company was the first to challenge the monopoly of British trading firms in the Malabar coast by directly exporting essential oils.

== Philanthropy ==
Mackar Pillay was instrumental in the establishment of co-operatives that strengthened Aluva's local economy, including the Keezhmad Khadi and Village Industries Co-operative Society, and the Keezhmad Co-operative Bank.

Pillay was also a proponent of the education of Muslim women. He presented a considerable scholarship endowment to the Aligarh Muslim University for funding the education of the institution's female students.

== Namesakes ==
- MES M. K. Mackar Pillay College of Advanced Studies, Edathala

== Descendants ==
- M. M. Abdul Hameed - industrialist, philanthropist, and final managing director of Mackar Pillay & Sons Limited
- Naureen Hassan - president and chief executive officer of UBS Americas; former first vice president and chief operating officer of the Federal Reserve Bank of New York
