= Tamil Nadu State Minorities Commission =

Indian State government agency

- தமிழ்நாடு மாநிலச் சிறுபான்மையினர் ஆணையம்

Commission overview
- Formed: 13 December 1989; 36 years ago
- Jurisdiction: Tamil Nadu
- Headquarters: Anna Salai, Chennai, Tamil Nadu, India
- Commission executive: Felix Gerald, Chairman
- Parent Commission: Backward Classes, Most Backward Classes and Minorities Welfare Department

The Tamil Nadu State Minorities Commission is a government agency established by the Government of Tamil Nadu to protect the rights and interests of minorities in the state. The commission works for the educational, social, and economic enlistment of religious and linguistic minorities residing in Tamil Nadu. Felix Gerald was appointed as its Chairman in August 2026.

== History ==
The commission was constituted on 13 December 1989. It functions as a statutory body under the Tamil Nadu State Minorities Commission Act, 2010. According to the act, the tenure of the Chairman, Member Secretary, and other members is three years.

== Former Chairmen ==
1. M. Prakash
2. S. Peter Alphonse (2021–2024)
3. Joe Arun (2024–2026)
