= C. Krishnamurali =

Indian politician

Member of the Tamil Nadu Legislative Assembly
- In office 12 May 2021 – 6 May 2026
- Preceded by: K. A. M. Muhammed Abubacker
- Succeeded by: T. M. Rajendran
- Constituency: Kadayanallur

Personal details
- Party: All India Anna Dravida Munnetra Kazhagam
- Relations: P. Chendur Pandian (father)
- Occupation: Politician
- Nickname: Kuttiyappa

Chendur Pandian Krishnamurali is an Indian politician. He is a member of the All India Anna Dravida Munnetra Kazhagam party. He was elected as a member of Tamil Nadu Legislative Assembly from Kadayanallur Assembly constituency in May 2021.
