= T. M. Rajendran =

Indian politician (born 1965)

T.M.RAJENDIRAN

Member of the Tamil Nadu Legislative Assembly
- Incumbent
- Assumed office 11 May 2026
- Preceded by: C. Krishnamurali
- Constituency: Kadayanallur

Personal details
- Party: Marumalarchi Dravida Munnetra Kazhagam

T. M. Rajendran (born 1965) is an Indian politician from Tamil Nadu. He is a member of the Tamil Nadu Legislative Assembly from Kadayanallur in Tenkasi district representing Marumalarchi Dravida Munnetra Kazhagam (MDMK).

Rajendran is from Kadayanallur, Tenkasi district, Tamil Nadu. He is the son of Muthaiah. His wife is a teacher. He completed his M.A. in public administration at Madurai Kamaraj University in 1994, after getting a PGDPM from Annamalai University in 1992. He declared assets worth Rs.2 crore in his affidavit to the Election Commission of India.

Rajendran became an MLA for the first time winning the 2026 Tamil Nadu Legislative Assembly election from Kadayanallur Assembly constituency representing Dravida Munnetra Kazhagam. He polled 79,832 votes and defeated his nearest rival and sitting MLA, C. Krishnamurali of the All India Anna Dravida Munnetra Kazhagam, by a margin of 6,253 votes.
