= S. Peter Alphonse =

Indian politician

Chairman - State Minorities Commission, Tamilnadu
- Incumbent
- Assumed office 29 June 2021
- Chief Minister: M. K. Stalin
- Preceded by: T. John Mahendran

Member of Legislative Assembly, Tamilnadu
- In office 11 May 2006 – 13 May 2011
- Preceded by: M. Subbiah Pandian
- Succeeded by: P. Chendur Pandian
- Constituency: Kadayanallur
- In office 6 February 1989 – 10 May 1996
- Preceded by: T. R. Venkataraman
- Succeeded by: K. Ravi Arunan
- Constituency: Tenkasi

Personal details
- Political party: Indian National Congress
- Occupation: Politician

S. Peter Alphonse is an Indian politician. He is the current Chairman of State minority Commission, Tamilnadu. He was elected to Tamil Nadu legislative assembly twice from Tenkasi constituency in 1989 and 1991 elections as an Indian National Congress candidate. He was elected to Tamil Nadu legislative assembly again as an Indian National Congress candidate from Kadayanallur constituency in 2006 election.
