= Tenkasi Assembly constituency =

One of the 234 State Legislative Assembly Constituencies in Tamil Nadu, in India

Coordinates: 8.96°N 77.31°E

Tenkasi
- Constituency No. 222 for the Tamil Nadu Legislative Assembly

Constituency details
- Country: India
- Region: South India
- State: Tamil Nadu
- District: Tenkasi
- Lok Sabha constituency: Tenkasi
- Established: 1951
- Total electors: 281,624

Member of Legislative Assembly
- 17th Tamil Nadu Legislative Assembly
- Incumbent Dr. Kalai Kathiravan
- Party: DMK
- Alliance: SPA
- Elected year: 2026

Tenkasi state assembly constituency is in Tenkasi district, Tamil Nadu. Elections and winners in the constituency are listed below. It is a part of Tenkasi Lok Sabha constituency. It is one of the 234 State Legislative Assembly Constituencies in Tamil Nadu in India.

== Members of Legislative Assembly ==
Year	Member	Political party
Madras State
1952	Subramaniam Pillai	Indian National Congress
1957	K. Sattanatha Karayalar	Independent
1962	A. R. Subbiah Mudaliar	Indian National Congress
1967	I. A. Chidambaram Pillai	Indian National Congress
Tamil Nadu
1971	Samsudeen alias Kathiravan	Dravida Munnetra Kazhagam
1977	S. Muthusamy Karayalar	Indian National Congress
1980	A. K. Sattanatha Karayalar	All India Anna Dravida Munnetra Kazhagam
1984	T. R. Venkataraman	Indian National Congress
1989	S. Peter Alphonse	Indian National Congress
1991	S. Peter Alphonse	Indian National Congress
1996	K. Ravi Arunan	Tamil Maanila Congress
2001	K. Annamalai	All India Anna Dravida Munnetra Kazhagam
2006	V. Karuppasamy Pandian	Dravida Munnetra Kazhagam
2011	R. Sarathkumar	All India Anna Dravida Munnetra Kazhagam
2016	S. Selvamohandas Pandian	All India Anna Dravida Munnetra Kazhagam
2021	S. Palani Nadar	Indian National Congress
2026	Dr. Kalai Kathiravan	Dravida Munnetra Kazhagam

== Election results ==
Vote share of winning candidates
2026	33.92%
2021	41.71%
2016	42.58%
2011	54.30%
2006	49.98%
2001	51.41%
1996	52.82%
1991	62.10%
1989	36.29%
1984	60.45%
1980	49.88%
1977	41.36%
1971	55.66%
1967	49.86%
1962	44.33%
1957	52.89%
1952	44.53%

=== 2026 ===
2026 Tamil Nadu Legislative Assembly election: Tenkasi
Party	Candidate	Votes	%	±%
DMK	Dr. Kalai Kathiravan	79,699	33.92	
AIADMK	S. Selvamohandas Pandian	69,400	29.53	▼12.24
TVK	A Rajaprakash	55,543	23.64	New
AIPTMMK	M Poosa Durai	7,715	3.28	New
PT	S Thirumalai Kumar	1,365	0.58	New
NOTA	NOTA	673	0.29	
Margin of victory		10299	4.4	+4.23
Turnout		2,34,987		
Rejected ballots				
Registered electors				
gain from		Swing		

=== 2021 ===
2021 Tamil Nadu Legislative Assembly election: Tenkasi
Party	Candidate	Votes	%	±%
INC	S. Palani Nadar	89,315	41.94%	−0.41
AIADMK	S. Selvamohandas Pandian	88,945	41.77%	−0.81
AMMK	S. Mohamed	9,944	4.67%	New
MNM	R. Thirumalaimuthu	2,188	1.03%	New
Independent	A. Madasamy	1,978	0.93%	New
NOTA	NOTA	1,159	0.54%	−1.13
Margin of victory		370	0.17%	−0.05%
Turnout		2,12,949	72.89%	−4.04%
Rejected ballots		382	0.18%	
Registered electors		2,92,168		
INC gain from AIADMK		Swing	-0.64%	

=== 2016 ===
2016 Tamil Nadu Legislative Assembly election: Tenkasi
Party	Candidate	Votes	%	±%
AIADMK	S. Selvamohandas Pandian	86,339	42.58%	−11.72
INC	S. Palani Nadar	85,877	42.35%	New
BJP	B. Selvi	11,716	5.78%	+4.19
TMC(M)	N. D. S. Charles	7,324	3.61%	New
NOTA	NOTA	3,391	1.67%	New
Independent	A. Madasamy	1,621	0.80%	New
PMK	P. Seetharaman	1,222	0.60%	New
Margin of victory		462	0.23%	−13.29%
Turnout		2,02,775	76.93%	−1.98%
Registered electors		2,63,584		
AIADMK hold		Swing	-11.72%	

=== 2011 ===
2011 Tamil Nadu Legislative Assembly election: Tenkasi
Party	Candidate	Votes	%	±%
SMK	R. Sarathkumar	92,253	54.30%	New
DMK	V. Karuppasamy Pandian	69,286	40.78%	−9.2
BJP	S. V. Anburaj	2,698	1.59%	−2.13
ABHM	S. Arumugam	1,507	0.89%	New
Independent	D. Mariappan	1,140	0.67%	New
Independent	M. Vethala Iyyankan	1,080	0.64%	New
Independent	S. Paramasivan	954	0.56%	New
Margin of victory		22,967	13.52%	0.15%
Turnout		1,69,910	78.91%	4.24%
Registered electors		2,15,324		
AIADMK gain from DMK		Swing	4.32%	

=== 2006 ===
2006 Tamil Nadu Legislative Assembly election: Tenkasi
Party	Candidate	Votes	%	±%
DMK	V. Karuppasamy Pandian	69,755	49.98%	+5.8
MDMK	Rama. Udayasuriyan	51,097	36.61%	New
BJP	K. Ravi Arunan	5,190	3.72%	New
DMDK	S. Kamaraj	5,081	3.64%	New
BSP	S. Chandran	2,607	1.87%	New
Independent	N. Mariappan	2,095	1.50%	New
AIFB	A. Muthuraja	1,645	1.18%	New
Independent	K. Bala Subramanian	1,166	0.84%	New
Margin of victory		18,658	13.37%	6.13%
Turnout		1,39,570	74.66%	10.87%
Registered electors		1,86,929		
DMK gain from AIADMK		Swing	-1.44%	

=== 2001 ===
2001 Tamil Nadu Legislative Assembly election: Tenkasi
Party	Candidate	Votes	%	±%
AIADMK	K. Annamalai	62,454	51.41%	New
DMK	V. Karuppasamy Pandian	53,662	44.18%	New
Independent	M. Sankarasubramanian Alias Lala M. Mani	2,064	1.70%	New
Independent	K. Balasubramanian	1,712	1.41%	New
Independent	S. Iyappan	861	0.71%	New
Independent	K. Subramanian	720	0.59%	New
Margin of victory		8,792	7.24%	−19.50%
Turnout		1,21,473	63.79%	−5.22%
Registered electors		1,90,762		
AIADMK gain from TMC(M)		Swing	-1.40%	

=== 1996 ===
1996 Tamil Nadu Legislative Assembly election: Tenkasi
Party	Candidate	Votes	%	±%
TMC(M)	K. Ravi Arunan	60,758	52.82%	New
INC	Aladi Sankaraiya	29,998	26.08%	−36.03
MDMK	Asan Ibrahim	10,250	8.91%	New
BJP	S. P. Deena Dayalan	9,962	8.66%	+1.77
AIIC(T)	S. Thanga Samy Nadar	1,224	1.06%	New
Margin of victory		30,760	26.74%	−8.42%
Turnout		1,15,038	69.02%	1.75%
Registered electors		1,73,679		
TMC(M) gain from INC		Swing	-9.29%	

=== 1991 ===
1991 Tamil Nadu Legislative Assembly election: Tenkasi
Party	Candidate	Votes	%	±%
INC	S. Peter Alphonse	65,142	62.10%	+25.82
DMK	S. Ramakrishnan	28,263	26.94%	−3.31
BJP	R. T. Sastha	7,228	6.89%	New
IUML	N. Chellathurai	3,185	3.04%	New
Margin of victory		36,879	35.16%	29.12%
Turnout		1,04,893	67.27%	−10.25%
Registered electors		1,61,652		
INC hold		Swing	25.82%	

=== 1989 ===
1989 Tamil Nadu Legislative Assembly election: Tenkasi
Party	Candidate	Votes	%	±%
INC	S. Peter Alphonse	39,643	36.29%	−24.16
DMK	V. Pandivalavan	33,049	30.25%	−7.27
AIADMK	A. M. Gani	20,578	18.84%	New
Independent	T. S. R. Venkataramana	12,860	11.77%	New
Independent	S. Samudram	1,221	1.12%	New
Margin of victory		6,594	6.04%	−16.90%
Turnout		1,09,248	77.52%	−1.44%
Registered electors		1,43,876		
INC hold		Swing	-24.16%	

=== 1984 ===
1984 Tamil Nadu Legislative Assembly election: Tenkasi
Party	Candidate	Votes	%	±%
INC	T. R. Venkataraman	57,011	60.45%	+11.49
DMK	M. Kuthalingam	35,383	37.52%	New
Independent	A. M. Subbniah	849	0.90%	New
Independent	A. S. Thirumalai	726	0.77%	New
Margin of victory		21,628	22.93%	22.01%
Turnout		94,312	78.96%	14.03%
Registered electors		1,25,902		
INC gain from AIADMK		Swing	10.57%	

=== 1980 ===
1980 Tamil Nadu Legislative Assembly election: Tenkasi
Party	Candidate	Votes	%	±%
AIADMK	A. K. Sattanatha Karayalar	36,638	49.88%	New
INC	T. R. Ramanan Alias Venkataramanan	35,963	48.96%	+7.6
Independent	M. Mohideen Pichai	452	0.62%	New
Independent	S. H. Kalyana Sundaram	404	0.55%	New
Margin of victory		675	0.92%	−15.18%
Turnout		73,457	64.93%	−7.22%
Registered electors		1,14,840		
AIADMK gain from INC		Swing	8.52%	

=== 1977 ===
1977 Tamil Nadu Legislative Assembly election: Tenkasi
Party	Candidate	Votes	%	±%
INC	S. Muthusamy Karayalar	30,273	41.36%	−2.98
Independent	J. Abdul Jabbar	18,489	25.26%	New
DMK	V. Pandi Valavan	12,745	17.41%	−38.25
JP	L. Arumugasamy	10,529	14.39%	New
Independent	T. K. V. Natarajan	1,158	1.58%	New
Margin of victory		11,784	16.10%	4.77%
Turnout		73,194	72.15%	−6.01%
Registered electors		1,02,800		
INC gain from DMK		Swing	-14.30%	

=== 1971 ===
1971 Tamil Nadu Legislative Assembly election: Tenkasi
Party	Candidate	Votes	%	±%
DMK	Samsudeen Alias Kathiravan	39,110	55.66%	+6.88
INC	I. C. Iswaran	31,150	44.34%	−5.52
Margin of victory		7,960	11.33%	10.26%
Turnout		70,260	78.16%	−4.99%
Registered electors		92,660		
DMK gain from INC		Swing	5.81%	

=== 1967 ===
1967 Madras Legislative Assembly election: Tenkasi
Party	Candidate	Votes	%	±%
INC	I. A. Chidambaram Pillai	34,561	49.86%	+5.53
DMK	K. M. K. Samsudin	33,818	48.79%	New
Independent	M. Pitchai	939	1.35%	New
Margin of victory		743	1.07%	−18.05%
Turnout		69,318	83.15%	7.86%
Registered electors		85,612		
INC hold		Swing	5.53%	

=== 1962 ===
1962 Madras Legislative Assembly election: Tenkasi
Party	Candidate	Votes	%	±%
INC	A. R. Subbiah Mudaliar	29,684	44.33%	+1.03
IUML	Reboi Sahib	16,882	25.21%	New
CPI	N. Shanmugam	13,003	19.42%	New
SWA	Sankaranarayana Iyer	4,138	6.18%	New
Independent	Palanichami	2,139	3.19%	New
Independent	Muthiah Thevar	1,117	1.67%	New
Margin of victory		12,802	19.12%	9.53%
Turnout		66,963	75.30%	3.58%
Registered electors		91,851		
INC gain from Independent		Swing	-8.56%	

=== 1957 ===
1957 Madras Legislative Assembly election: Tenkasi
Party	Candidate	Votes	%	±%
Independent	K. Sattanatha Karayalar	31,145	52.89%	New
INC	I. A. Chidambaram Pillai	25,499	43.30%	−1.23
Independent	A. Srinivasan	2,243	3.81%	New
Margin of victory		5,646	9.59%	4.88%
Turnout		58,887	71.72%	−0.47%
Registered electors		82,107		
Independent gain from INC		Swing	8.36%	

=== 1952 ===
1952 Madras Legislative Assembly election: Tenkasi
Party	Candidate	Votes	%	±%
INC	Subramaniam Pillai	26,340	44.53%	New
Independent	Sevagupandia Thevar	23,557	39.82%	New
Socialist Party (India)	Pichia Mudaliar	9,256	15.65%	New
Margin of victory		2,783	4.70%	
Turnout		59,153	72.19%	
Registered electors		81,944		
INC win (new seat)				
