= T. Perumal =

Indian politician

T. Perumal is an Indian politician and former Member of the Legislative Assembly. He was elected to the Tamil Nadu Legislative Assembly as an Anna Dravida Munnetra Kazhagam candidate from Kadayanallur constituency in 1984 election.
