= K. A. M. Muhammed Abubacker =

Indian politician

Member of the Tamil Nadu Legislative Assembly
- In office 16 May 2016 – 12 May 2021
- Preceded by: P. Chendur Pandian
- Succeeded by: C. Krishnamurali
- Constituency: Kadayanallur

Legislative Party Leader of Indian Union Muslim League in the Tamil Nadu Legislative Assembly
- In office 25 May 2016 – 2 May 2021
- Governor: Banwarilal Purohit
- Chief Minister: Edappadi K. Palaniswami
- Deputy chief minister: O. Panneerselvam
- Leader of Opposition in the Tamil Nadu Legislative Assembly: M. K. Stalin

General Secretary of the Tamilnadu State Indian Union Muslim League
- President: K. M. Kader Mohideen

Personal details
- Born: 6 September 1971 (age 55) Kayalpattinam, Thoothukudi, Tamil Nadu, India
- Party: Indian Union Muslim League
- Occupation: Politician
- Website: http://abubackermla.com/

Kayalpattinam A. M. Muhammed Abubacker is an Indian politician from Tamil Nadu and Tamilnadu State General Secretary of the Indian Union Muslim League (IUML) political party. He was Legislative Party Leader of the Indian Union Muslim League from 2016 to 2021, representing Kadayanallur constituency in Tenkasi district.
