= Government Victoria Hospital, Kollam =

Hospital in Kerala, India

Coordinates: 8.888371258559431°N 76.58576726112146°E

- Kollam Jilla Panchayath

Geography
- Location: Near District Hospital, Kollam, India

Organisation
- Care system: Maternity hospital

Services
- Emergency department: yes
- Helipad: No

History
- Opened: 1887

Links
- Website: http://www.victoriahospital.in/

Government Victoria Hospital, established in 1887, is a maternity hospital in Kollam, Kerala, India. It was the first maternity hospital in Travancore, and is known as Kollam's "hospital of women and children". In the early years, it functioned as a medical school for women and was called the Victoria Hospital and Medical School for Women. The college functioned under the surgeon, E. Poonen. It is functioning under the control of Kollam Jilla Panchayath at present. Projects including an Autism Clinic, Swapnachiraku, Infertility Clinic, Mathrusanthwanam, Snehathooval and MRI scanning unit are implemented by Kollam Jilla Panchayath in the hospital for the last years. The hospital has a monthly average outpatient (OP) of 15500, inpatient (IP) of 1300 and around 500 deliveries.
