= I. A. C. Pillai =

Indian politician

I. A. C. Pillai is an Indian politician and former Member of the Legislative Assembly. He was elected to the Tamil Nadu Legislative Assembly as an Indian National Congress candidate from Tenkasi constituency in 1967 election.
