= Jamal Mohamed College =

Autonomous college in Tamil Nadu, India

- Motto: اهدِنَــــا الصِّرَاطَ المُستَقِيمَ
- Motto in English: Show us the right path
- Established: July 11, 1951; 75 years ago
- Founders: Janab. M. Jamal Mohamed Sahib and Janab N.M. Khajamian Rowther
- Affiliations: Bharathidasan University
- Academic affiliations: UGC; AICTE; NAAC
- Chairperson: A. K. Khaja Nazeemudeen
- President: M. J. Jamal Mohamed Bilal
- Principal: D.I. George Amalarethinam
- Dean: S. Kareemullah (Arts); A. R. Mohamed Shanavas (Science)
- Academic staff: 990
- Students: c. 12,000
- Location: 7, Race Course Road, Khaja Nagar, Tiruchirappalli, Tamil Nadu, 620020, India; 10.7863°N 78.6957°E
- Campus: 87 acres (35 ha)
Colors
- Website: www.jmc.edu
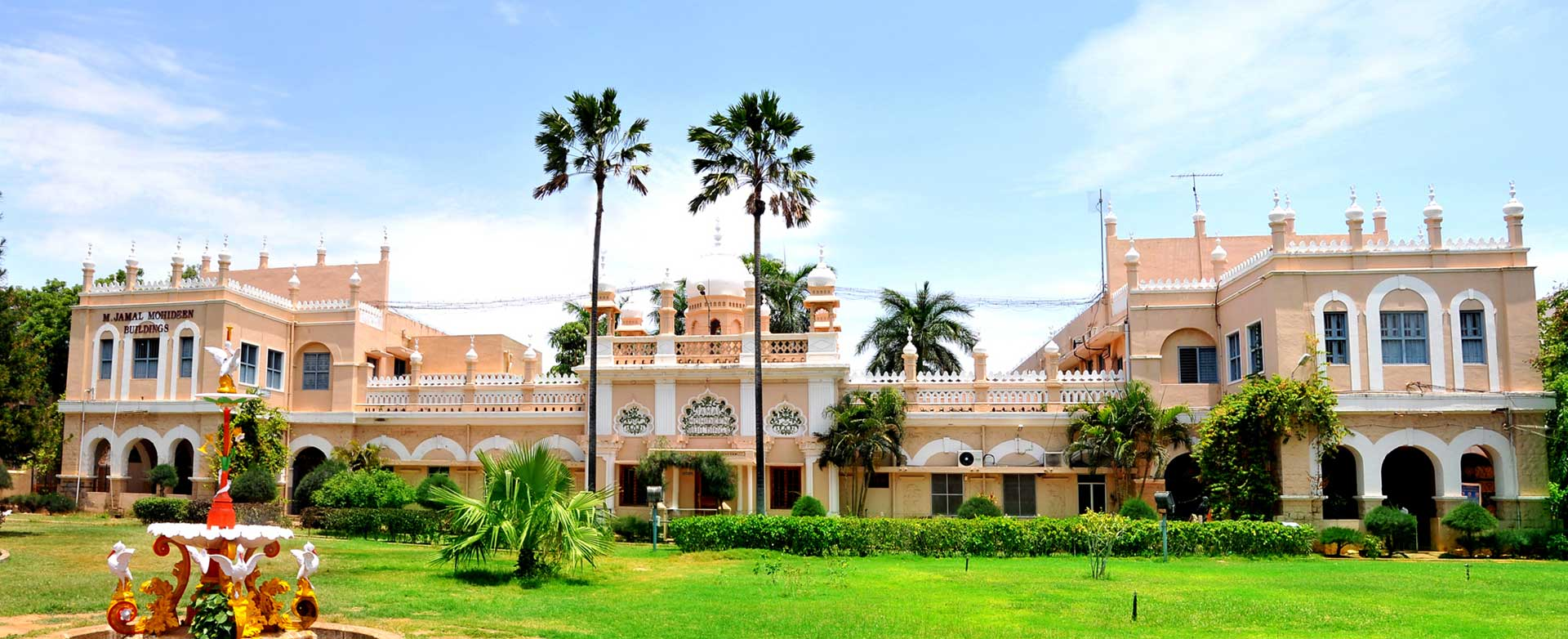

College rankings

General – India
- NIRF (Colleges) (2024): 59

Jamal Mohamed College is an aided and autonomous college located in Tiruchirappalli, Tamil Nadu, India. Established in 1951, the institution is affiliated to the Bharathidasan University and offers undergraduate, postgraduate, and research programmes in arts, science, and commerce.

== History ==
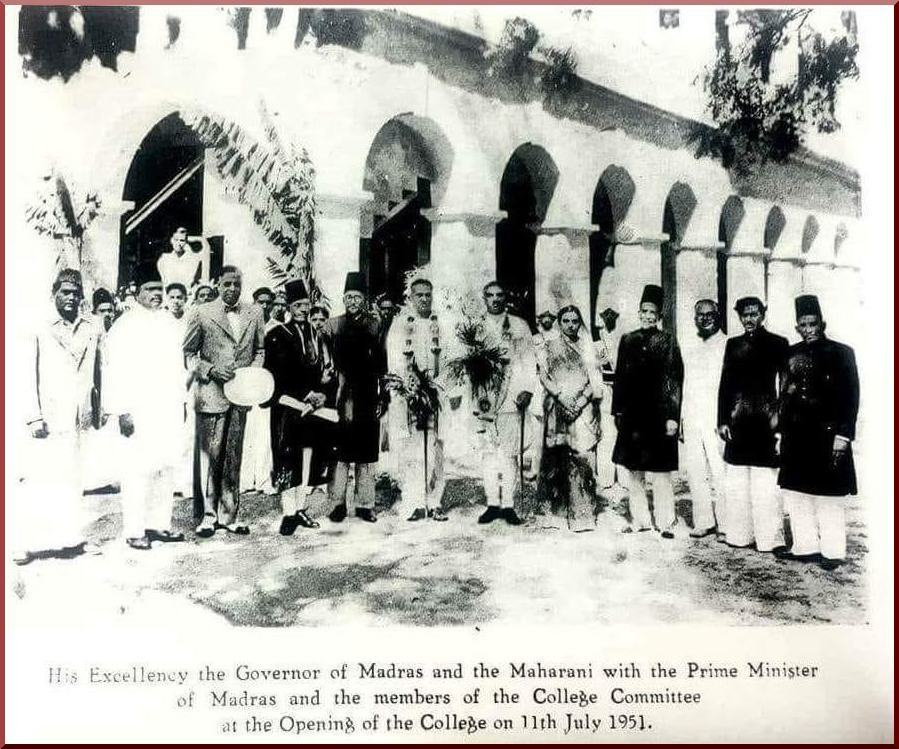
College Building Opening

Jamal Mohamed College was established on 11 July 1951 by M. Jamal Mohamed and N. M. Khajamian Rowther. The college was originally affiliated with the University of Madras and later became affiliated with Bharathidasan University in 1982.

The college was established as a minority institution, with the aim of providing higher education for socially under-privileged sections and specifically the Muslim minority.

The college has been recognised by the University Grants Commission (UGC) under sections 2(f) and 12(B) of the UGC Act. It received autonomous status in 2004. It is administered by the Society of Jamal Mohamed College.

== Academics ==
The college was able to become a multi-faculty institution with 11 undergraduate programmes, 11 postgraduate programmes and 2 M.Phil. programmes under Government Aided stream and 11 U.G. programmes, 13 P.G. programmes, 17 M.Phil. and 16 Ph.D. programmes under self financing stream. The college also offers 13 U.G., 14 P.G. programmes, 16 M.Phil. and 15 Ph.D. programmes exclusively for women as part of women empowerment during the second shift of the college. During 2021–22, the college offers 23 Under Graduate, 20 Post Graduate, 7 UGC Sponsored Career-Oriented programmes, 17 M.Phil. and 16 Ph.D., programmes.

The present student strength is around 12,000, of which 4,605 are women students. There are about 494 teaching and 297 non-teaching staff.

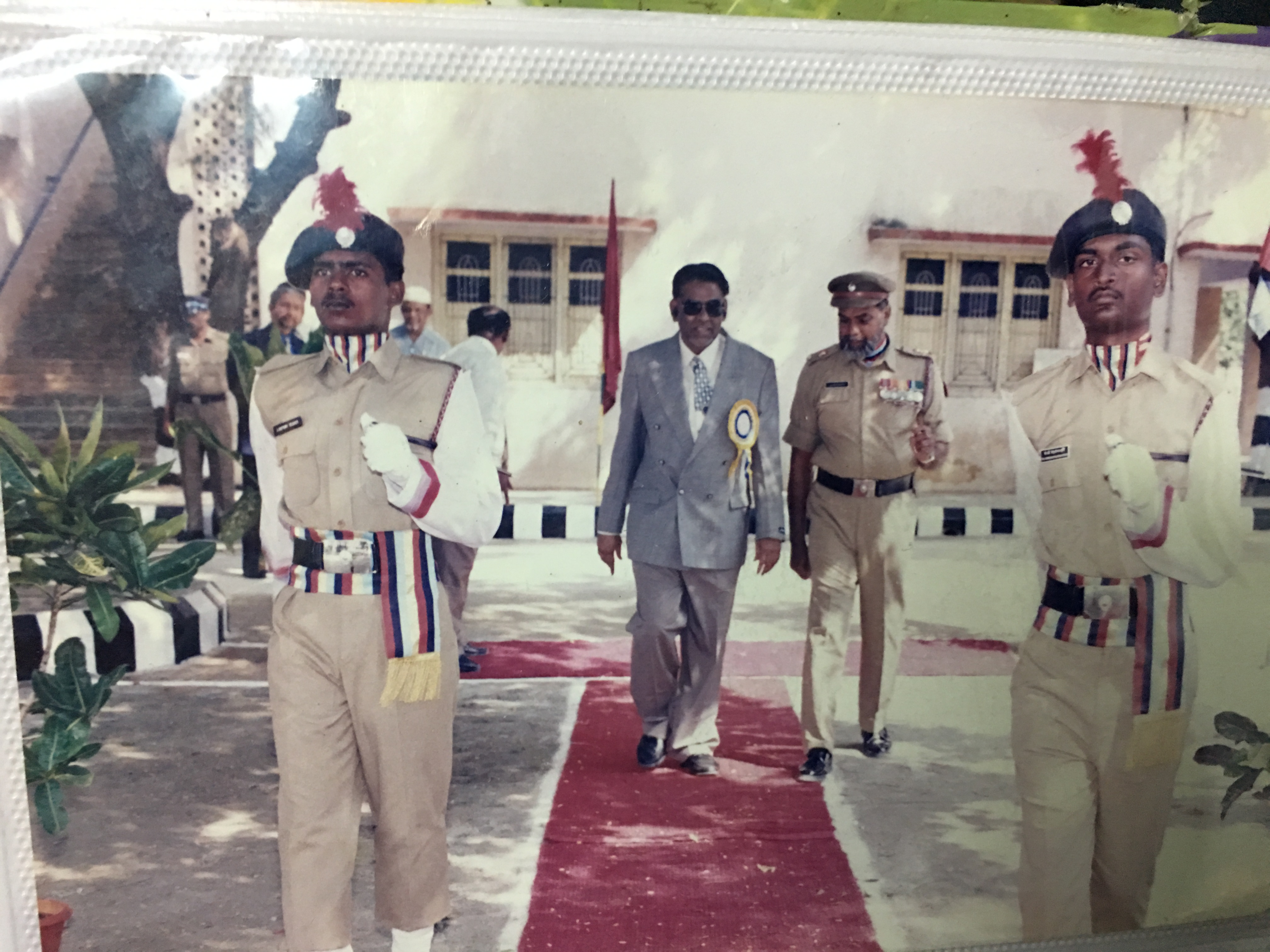

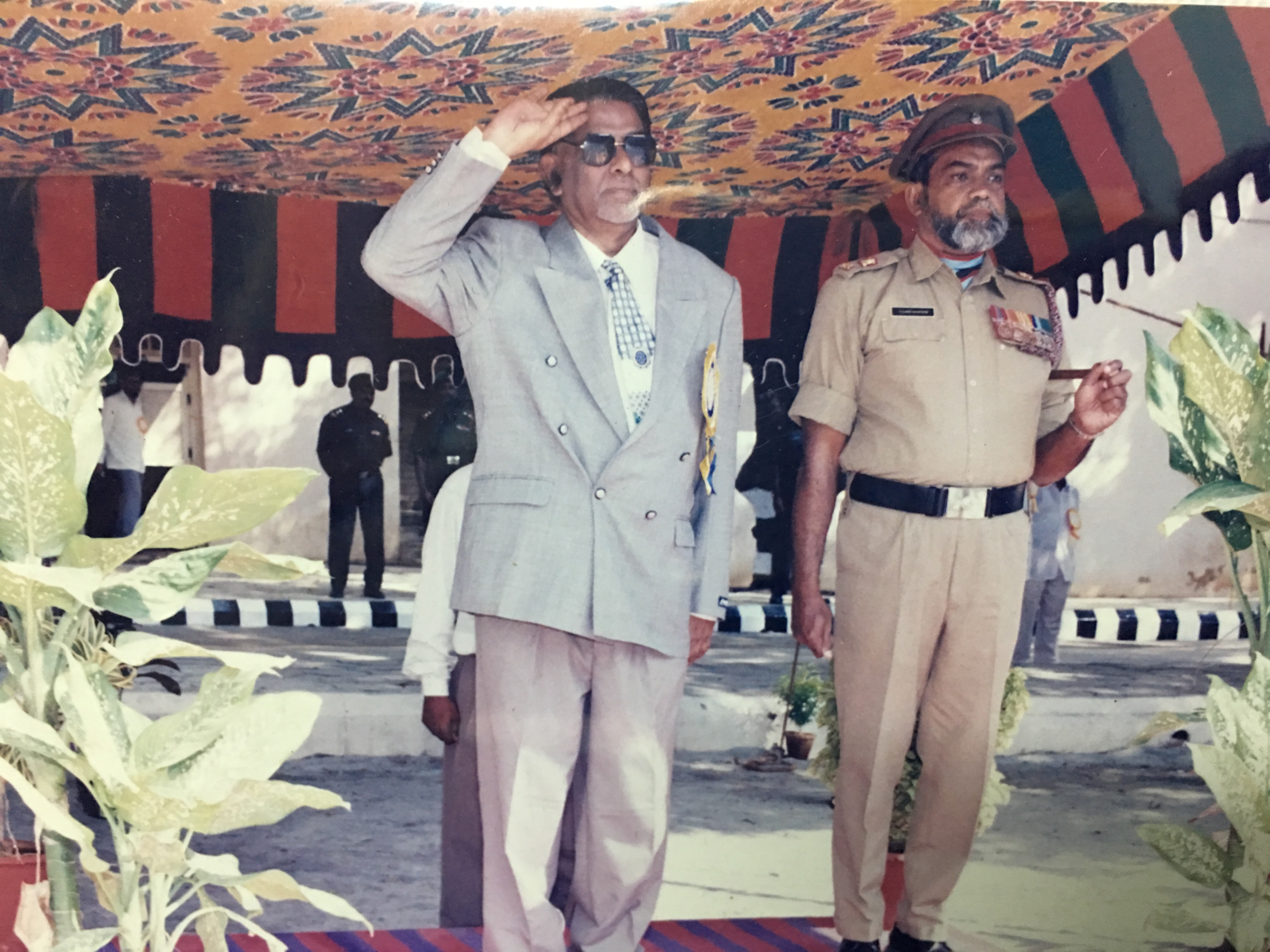

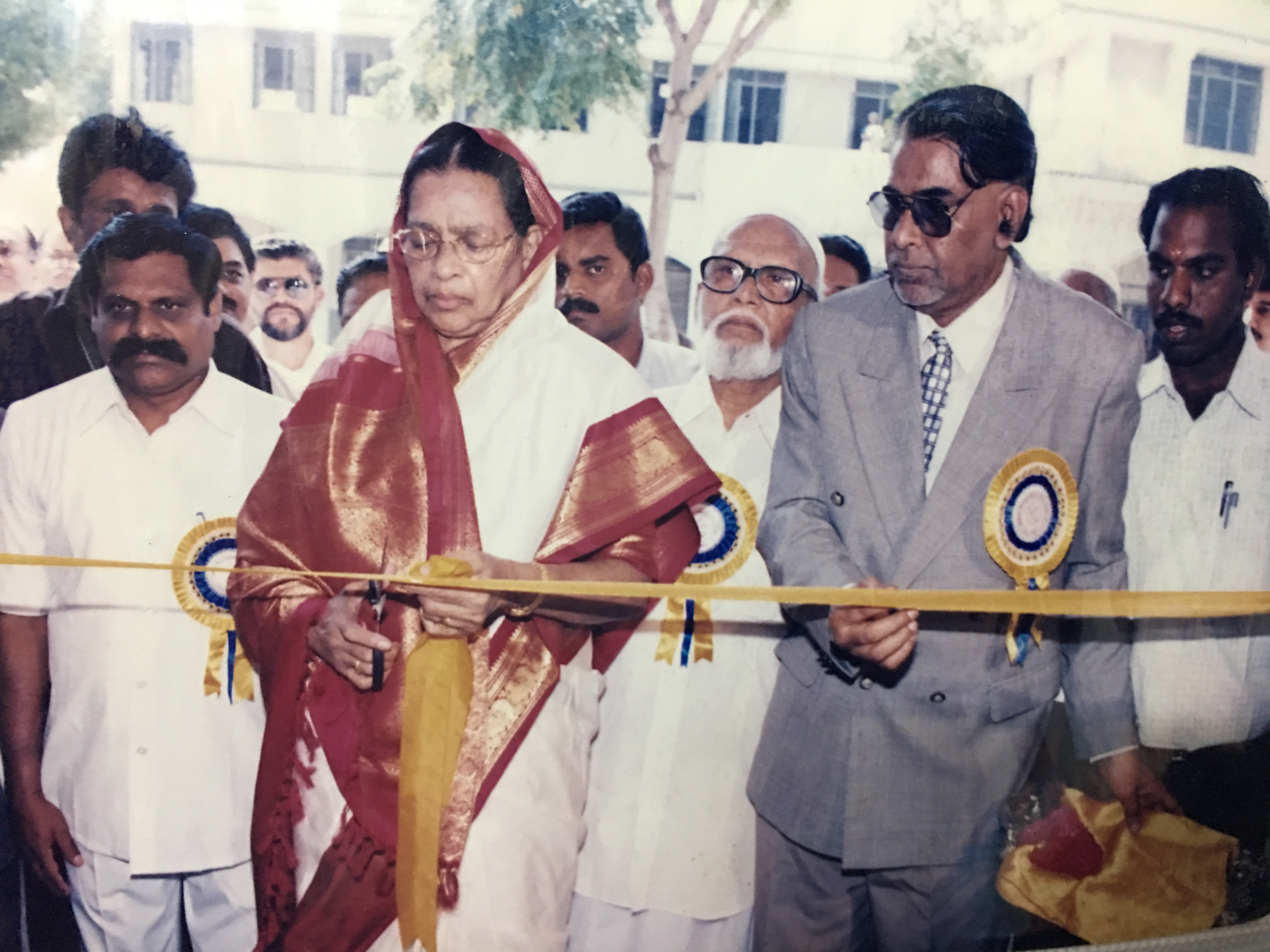

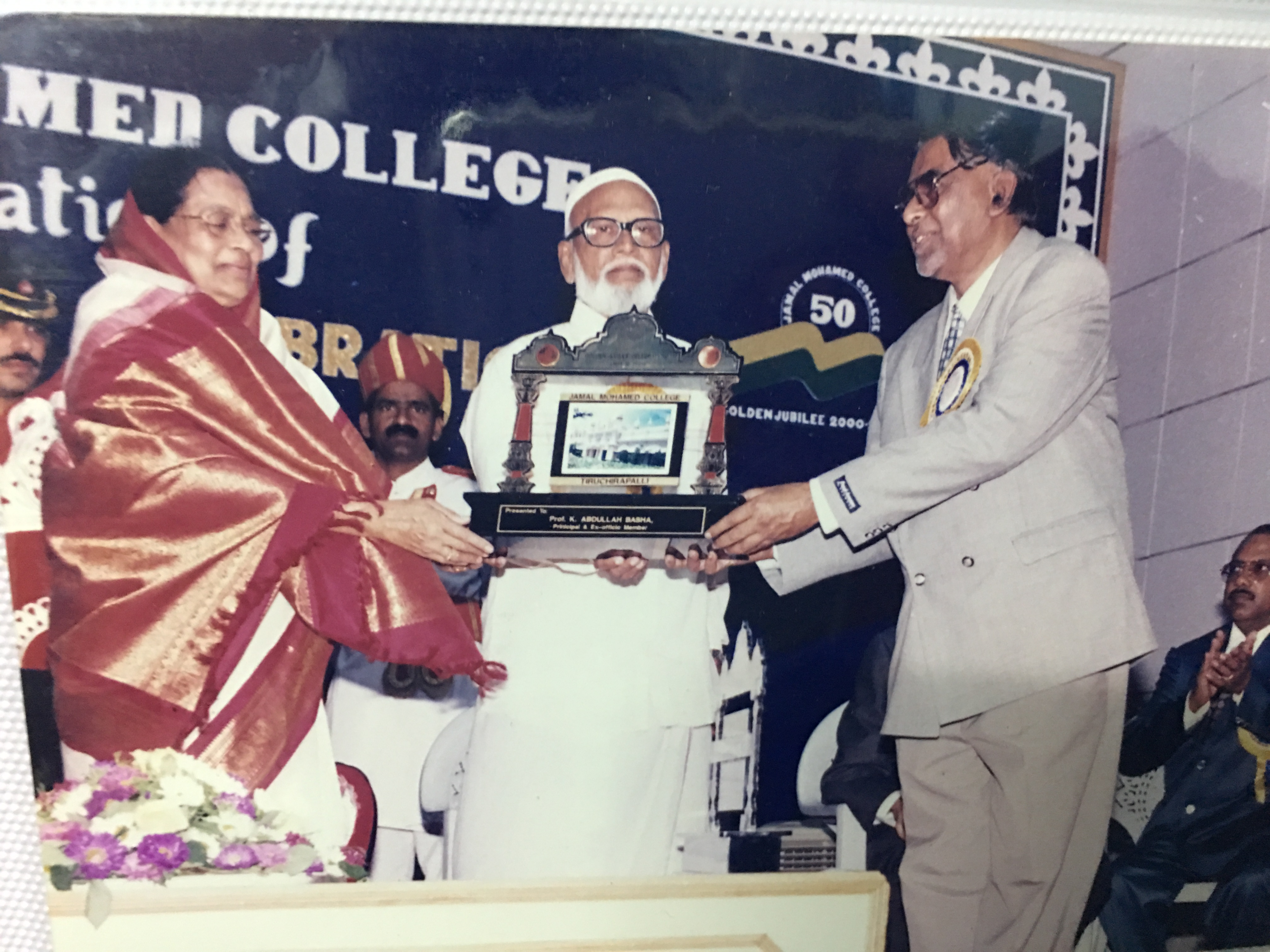

== Accreditation and recognitions ==
- The college has been accredited by the National Assessment and Accreditation Council (NAAC); in its 4th cycle it reported a CGPA of 3.69 and grade A++.
- The UGC designated the college as a College with Potential for Excellence (CPE).

== Rankings ==
Jamal Mohamed College was ranked 84th among colleges in India by the National Institutional Ranking Framework (NIRF) in 2025, slipping from 59th in 2024.
