= S. Palani Nadar =

Indian politician

Member of Legislative Assembly, Tamilnadu
- In office 12 May 2021 – 2026
- Preceded by: S. Selvamohandas Pandian
- Constituency: Tenkasi

Personal details
- Party: Indian National Congress
- Occupation: Politician

S. Palani Nadar is an Indian politician. He was elected to Tamil Nadu legislative assembly from Tenkasi constituency in 2021 as an Indian National Congress candidate.
