= S. Muthusamy Karayalar =

Indian politician

S. Muthusamy Karayalar is an Indian politician and former Member of the Legislative Assembly. He was elected to the Tamil Nadu legislative assembly as an Indian National Congress candidate from Tenkasi constituency in 1977 election.
