= Kalai Kathiravan =

Indian politician

Member of the Tamil Nadu Legislative Assembly
- Incumbent
- Assumed office 2026
- Preceded by: S. Palani Nadar
- Constituency: Tenkasi

Personal details
- Party: Dravida Munnetra Kazhagam
- Profession: Politician

Kalai Kathiravan is an Indian politician from Tamil Nadu. He is a member of the Tamil Nadu Legislative Assembly from Tenkasi representing the Dravida Munnetra Kazhagam.

== Political career ==
Kathiravan won the Tenkasi seat in the 2026 Tamil Nadu Legislative Assembly election as a candidate of the Dravida Munnetra Kazhagam. He received 79,699 votes and defeated S. Selva Mohandas Pandian of the All India Anna Dravida Munnetra Kazhagam by a margin of 10,299 votes.
