= K. Sattanatha Karayalar =

Indian politician

Member of the Travancore-Cochin Legislative Assembly
- In office 1951 - 1954; 1954 - 1957
- Constituency: Sengottai

Member of the Madras State Assembly
- In office 1957 - 1962; 1980 - 1985
- Preceded by: T. R. Ramanan Alias Venkataramanan
- Constituency: Tenkasi

Personal details
- Political party: All India Anna Dravida Munnetra Kazhagam

K. Sattanatha Karayalar was an Indian politician and former Member of the Legislative Assembly. He was elected to Travancore-Cochin Legislative Assembly in 1952 and 1954 elections from Shenkottai constituency as an Independent candidate.

He was elected to the Tamil Nadu legislative assembly as an Independent candidate from Tenkasi constituency in 1957 election and from Tenkasi constituency as an Anna Dravida Munnetra Kazhagam candidate in 1980 election.
