= S. Selvamohandas Pandian =

Indian politician

Member of Legislative Assembly, Tamilnadu
- In office 2016–2021
- Preceded by: R. Sarathkumar
- Succeeded by: S. Palani Nadar
- Constituency: Tenkasi

Personal details
- Political party: All India Anna Dravida Munnetra Kazhagam
- Occupation: Politician

S. Selvamohandas Pandian is an Indian politician. Son of S. Sivan Pandian Nadar.He was elected to Tamil Nadu legislative assembly from Tenkasi constituency in 2016 as an AIADMK candidate.
