= K. Naina Mohammad =

Indian politician

K. Naina Mohammad is an Indian politician and former Member of the Legislative Assembly. He was elected to the Tamil Nadu legislative assembly as a Dravida Munnetra Kazhagam candidate from Kadayanallur constituency in 1996 election.
