= A. R. Subbiah Mudaliar =

Indian politician

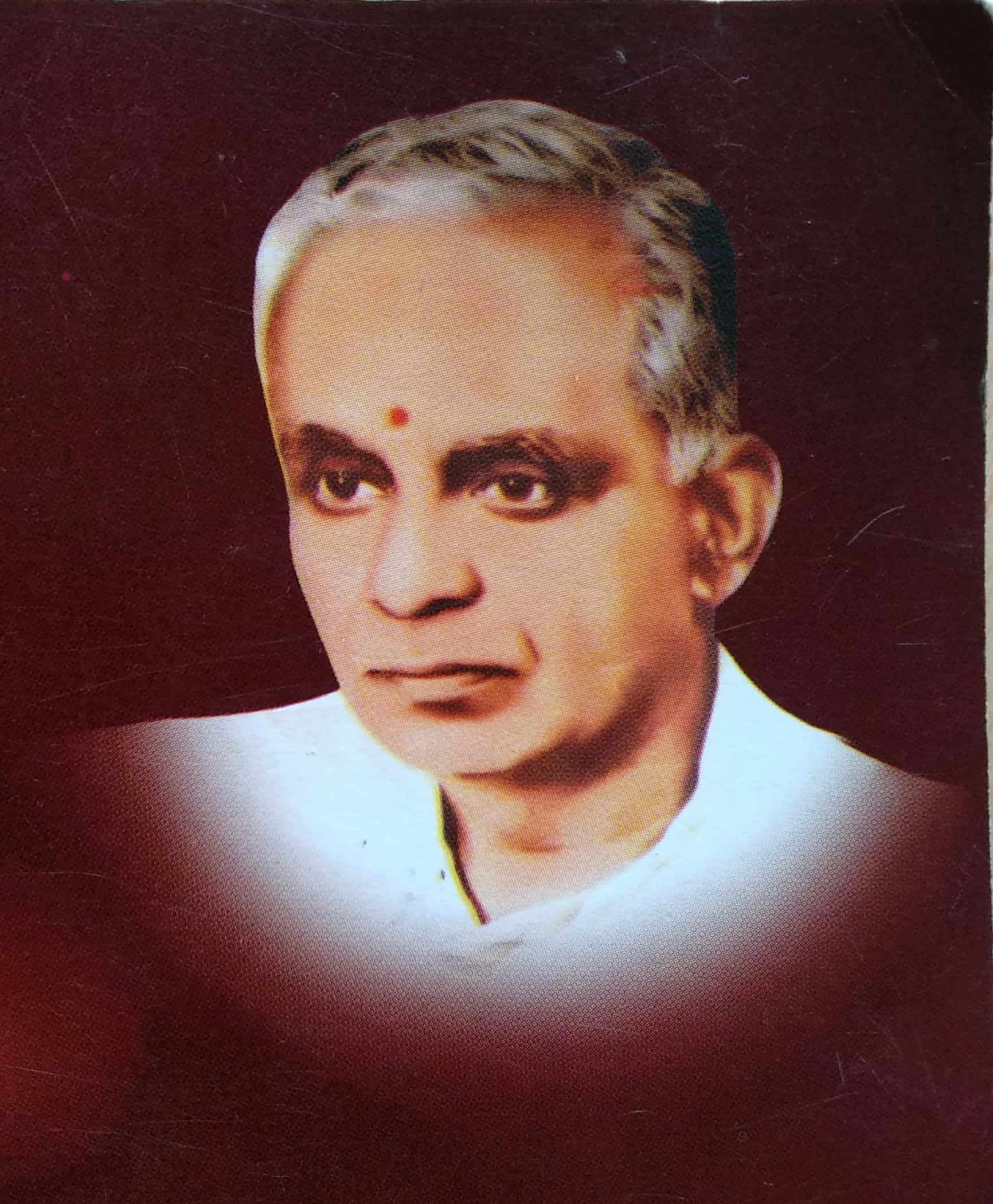
A. R. Subbiah Mudaliar

A. R. Subbiah Mudaliar was an Indian politician and former Member of the Legislative Assembly. He was elected to the Tamil Nadu legislative assembly as an Indian National Congress candidate from Sankarankoil constituency in 1957 election, as an Indian National Congress candidate from Tenkasi constituency in 1962 election and from Kadayanallur constituency as an Independent candidate in 1967 election and from Kadayanallur constituency as a Dravida Munnetra Kazhagam candidate in 1971 election
