= A. Shahul Hameed =

Indian politician

A. Shahul Hameed is an Indian politician and former Member of the Legislative Assembly. He was elected to the Tamil Nadu legislative assembly as an Independent candidate from Kadayanallur constituency in 1980 election.
