= P. Chendur Pandian =

Indian politician

P. Chendur Pandian (3 April 1951 – 11 July 2015) was an Indian politician and member of the 14th Tamil Nadu Legislative Assembly from Kadayanallur constituency. He represented the All India Anna Dravida Munnetra Kazhagam party.

Pandian was born in Sengottai on 3 April 1951. He was vice-chairman of Kadayanallur municipality between 1996 and 2001, having been a member since 1986. He won the Kadayanallur constituency in the state assembly at the 2011 elections when he defeated the sitting Indian National Congress representative, S. Peter Alphonse. Pandian polled 80,794 votes and Alphonse was runner-up with 64,708. On 27 February 2013, relinquished his post as Minister for Khadi and Village Industries when he was appointed the Minister for Tourism by Jayalalithaa, the Chief Minister. He ceased to be Minister for Tourism on 18 June 2013.

Pandian held no ministerial office at the time of his death on 11 July 2015, aged 64. At the time he became critically ill with cardiac problems in January of that year, he was the Minister for Hindu Religious and Charitable Endowments. His ministerial portfolio was passed to R. Kamaraj at the time but he remained minister without portfolio in the government headed by O. Panneerselvam. He ceased to be a minister when Jayalalithaa returned as Chief Minister in May.
