= Samsudeen =

Indian politician

Samsudeen is an Indian politician and former Member of the Legislative Assembly. He was elected to the Tamil Nadu legislative assembly as a Dravida Munnetra Kazhagam candidate from Tenkasi constituency in 1971 election and Kadayanallur constituency in 1989 election.
