= Keezhmadu =

Village in Ernakulam District, Kerala, India

Keezhmadu is a village located in Aluva, Ernakulam district on the way to Perumbavoor. It can be reached by KSRTC buses or by hiring vehicles. It is about 6 km (3.7 mi) from Aluva. The famous school for the blind is situated there. The famous female singer Minmini was born there.
