= K. Annamalai (AIADMK politician) =

Indian hotelier and politician (born 1948)

K. Annamalai (born 15 August 1948) is an Indian hotelier and former politician who served in the Tamil Nadu Legislative Assembly from 2001 until 2006. A member of the All India Anna Dravida Munnetra Kazhagam, he represented the Tenkasi constituency.

== Biography ==
K. Annamalai was born on 15 August 1948 in the village of Karisaloor, located near Pavoorchatram in Tamil Nadu. He is a hotel owner, and funded the construction of religious structures. He is married with four children. In 1980, Annamalai became a member of the All India Anna Dravida Munnetra Kazhagam, and was secretary of the Karisaloor branch of the party in 1990. By 2000, he was the chairman of the Tirunelveli East district council.

Annamalai ran for the Tamil Nadu Legislative Assembly in the 2001 state election, standing in the Tenkasi constituency. He was elected with 62,454 votes, defeating Dravida Munnetra Kazhagam candidate Karuppasamy Pandian, who received 53,662 votes. Annamalai was a member of the Committee on Estimates. He did not seek re-election in the 2006 state election.

In 2006, Annamalai was appointed president of the unified Tirunelveli district council.

== See also ==
- K. Ravi Arunan
- Karuppasamy Pandian
