= M. M. A. Razak =

Indian politician (died 2022)

M. M. A. Razak was an Indian politician and former Member of the Legislative Assembly. He was elected to the Tamil Nadu legislative assembly as an Anna Dravida Munnetra Kazhagam candidate from Kadayanallur constituency in 1977 election. He was in the Dravida Munnetra Kazhagam party. Moreover, he was also head of the association of former group of all MLAs in Dravida Kazhagam. He died in February 2022 due to cardiac attack.
