= P. K. Abdul Gafoor =

Indian education pioneer

P. K. Abdul Gafoor founded the Muslim Educational Society in Kerala, India.

Abdul Gafoor was a medical doctor by profession and served as a Professor of Medicine at Calicut Medical College. He studied in London Royal college of Medicine and lived with his family in the United Kingdom

Historian M. G. S. Narayanan opined on him as "one of tallest leaders of the Muslim community to take note of economic weakness of a large section of the community and make strenuous efforts towards their progress". The Annual Dr. P M A Gafoor Memorial Lecture is held in his honour each year. The Dr. P. K. Abdul Gafoor Memorial Cultural Complex at Kaloor, Cochin housing the Cochin Stock Exchange is also named in his honour.

His son is Dr P. A. Fazal Gafoor, a doctor and the current president of MES.
