= T. R. Venkataraman =

Indian politician

T. R. Venkataraman, an Indian politician, formerly served as a Member of the Legislative Assembly. The Tenkasi constituency elected him to the Tamil Nadu legislative assembly as an Indian National Congress candidate in the 1984 election.
