= Masha Nazeem =

Indian inventor (born 1993)

Masha Nazeem Inventor

Personal details
- Born: 1993 (age 32–33) Eraviputhoor Kadai, Kanyakumari District
- Education: SSN College of Engineering (B.E); SRM University (M.Tech)
- Website: www.mashanazeem.in

Masha Nazeem is an Indian inventor was born and brought up from Nagercoil in Kanniyakumari district (Tamil Nadu). In 2005, during her eighth grade, she designed a hi-tech train toilet (hygienic drainage disposal system in trains) that gained her two national and one international awards.

== Personal life ==
Nazeem was born in 1993 and was raised in Nagercoil in the Kanniyakumari district of India. Nazeem's father worked at the Treasury Office in Kanniyakumari.

=== Education ===
Nazeem attended St. Joseph’s Convent Higher Secondary School before pursuing a B.E in Electronic and Electrical Engineering at Sri Sivasubramaniya Nadar (SSN) College of Engineering. She later obtained an M.Tech in Power Electronics in SRM University, Kattankulathur (near Chennai).

== Career ==
In 2006 at age 12, Nazeem was honoured at the Indian Science Congress in Hyderabad for her invention of a drainage system for railways. In 2015, Nazeem was selected for the Entrepreneurship Development Training Programme in the United States. The next year, Nazeem was invited to be a guest speaker at the 103rd Indian Science Conference.

Currently, Nazeem is an innovation lead in GEMS New Millennium School, United Arab Emirates.

== Awards and honors ==
- 2009 - IGNITE National Award (II Prize)
- 2010 - IGNITE National Award (I Prize)
- 2015 - Two National and an International award.
- 2016 - Chief Minister's State Youth Award (women's category)
- 2018 - National Youth Award (from the Ministry of Youth Affairs and Sports) - for contributions to science and technology

== Inventions ==
- Transparent testing tool kit for students
- "Mechanical porter" (a luggage carrying system on wheels)
- Burglar alarm
- Underground conveyor belt system for transporting school bags

=== Hygienic Drainage Disposal System ===
After hearing a speech from the Railway Minister that warned officials may face punishment if the stench in railway systems was not dealt with, Nazeem invented a high-tech train toilet system. The Hygienic Drainage Disposal System was presented to several railway officials and India's then-president A. P. J. Abdul Kalam in 2005. Following Kalam's advice, Nazeem patented the invention.

=== Flameless seal-maker ===
As a teenager, Nazeem witnessed her father melting lac over an open flame. Upon her realization that this was potentially dangerous, Nazeem sought to create a better way to safely heat lac for sealing. Nazeem invented and patented the flameless seal-maker that heats lac, wax or other seal-making materials using electricity. The flameless seal-maker was used at polling booths during the 2011 Assembly polls in Tamil Nadu.

== Masha Innovation Center ==
In her hometown, she setup Masha Innovation Center, a research laboratory and workshop, the main objective is to provide free hands-on training to help the young inventors to make their ideas to reality. Through this Innovation Center, she brings student's ideas to attention and converts them into inventors.
