= S. Nagoor Meeran =

Indian politician (died 2018)

S. Nagoor Meeran (died 27 August 2018) was an Indian politician and former member of the Legislative Assembly. He was elected to the Tamil Nadu legislative assembly as an Anna Dravida Munnetra Kazhagam candidate from Kadayanallur constituency in the 1991 election. He held the tourism portfolio and rural industries ministry in Jayalalitha's cabinet between 1991 and 1996, one of the youngest ministers in Jayalalithaa's first cabinet during 1991–96
