= District Hospital, Kollam =

Coordinates: 8.88842786377081°N 76.58590723921289°E

A. A. Rahim memorial District Hospital
- Government of Kerala (administrative control); Kollam District Panchayat (operations)
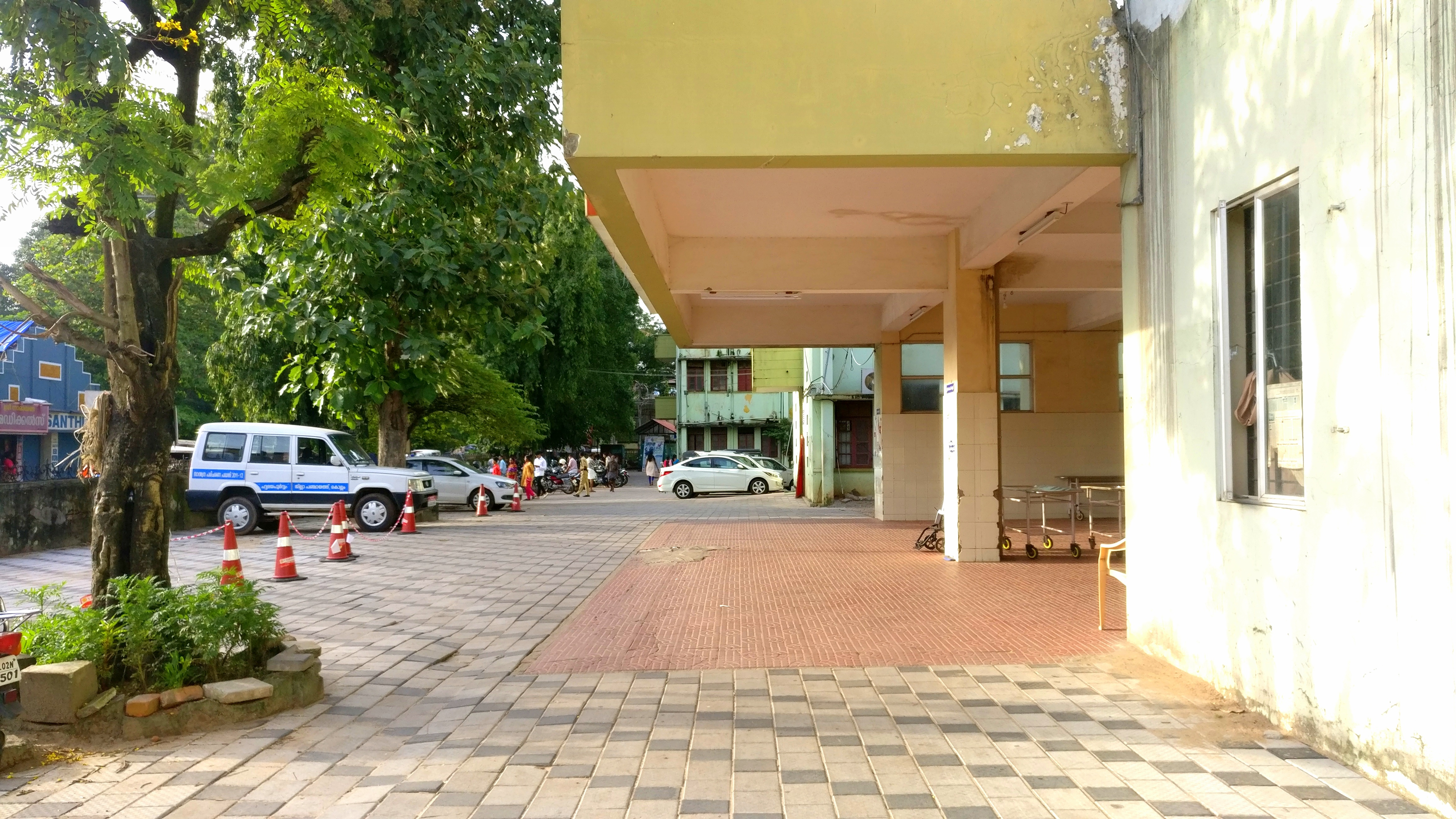
- Entrance of Kollam District Hospital

Geography
- Location: Kollam, India

Organisation
- Type: District

Services
- Emergency department: yes
- Beds: 537

Helipads
- Helipad: No

History
- Founded: 1957

A. A. Rahim memorial District Hospital, Kollam is a general hospital located in Kollam, Kerala, India. It is the main referral hospital for the Kollam district, and it provides a wide range of medical services, including inpatient and outpatient care, diagnostic and therapeutic services, and research. It was established on 20 December 1957, under the ownership of as a secondary level care institution. It was renamed after A.A. Rahim, politician, freedom fighter, and union minister.

District hospital Kollam has sanctioned bed strength of 537.

The Kollam District Hospital functions under the administrative control of the Health and Family Welfare Department, Government of Kerala, while its operational control rests with the Kollam District Panchayat.

== Out-Patient Departments ==
- General Medicine
- General Surgery
- Orthopaedics
- ENT
- Ophthalmology
- Psychiatry
- Pulmonology
- Dermatology
- Physical Medicine & Rehabilitation
- Geriatrics
- NCD Clinic
- ART Clinic
- Filaria Clinic, IDRV Clinic, STD Clinic, Transgender Clinic
- Chemotherapy
- Dialysis
- Blood Bank

Obstetrics and Gynaecology along with paediatrics are provided at Government Victoria Hospital, Kollam
