= M. Subbiah Pandian =

Indian politician

M. Subbiah Pandian is an Indian politician and former Member of the Legislative Assembly. He was elected to the Tamil Nadu legislative assembly as an All India Anna Dravida Munnetra Kazhagam candidate from Kadayanallur constituency in the 2001 election.
