= Manushyaputhiran =

Indian poet, writer and social activist

Manushya Puthiran
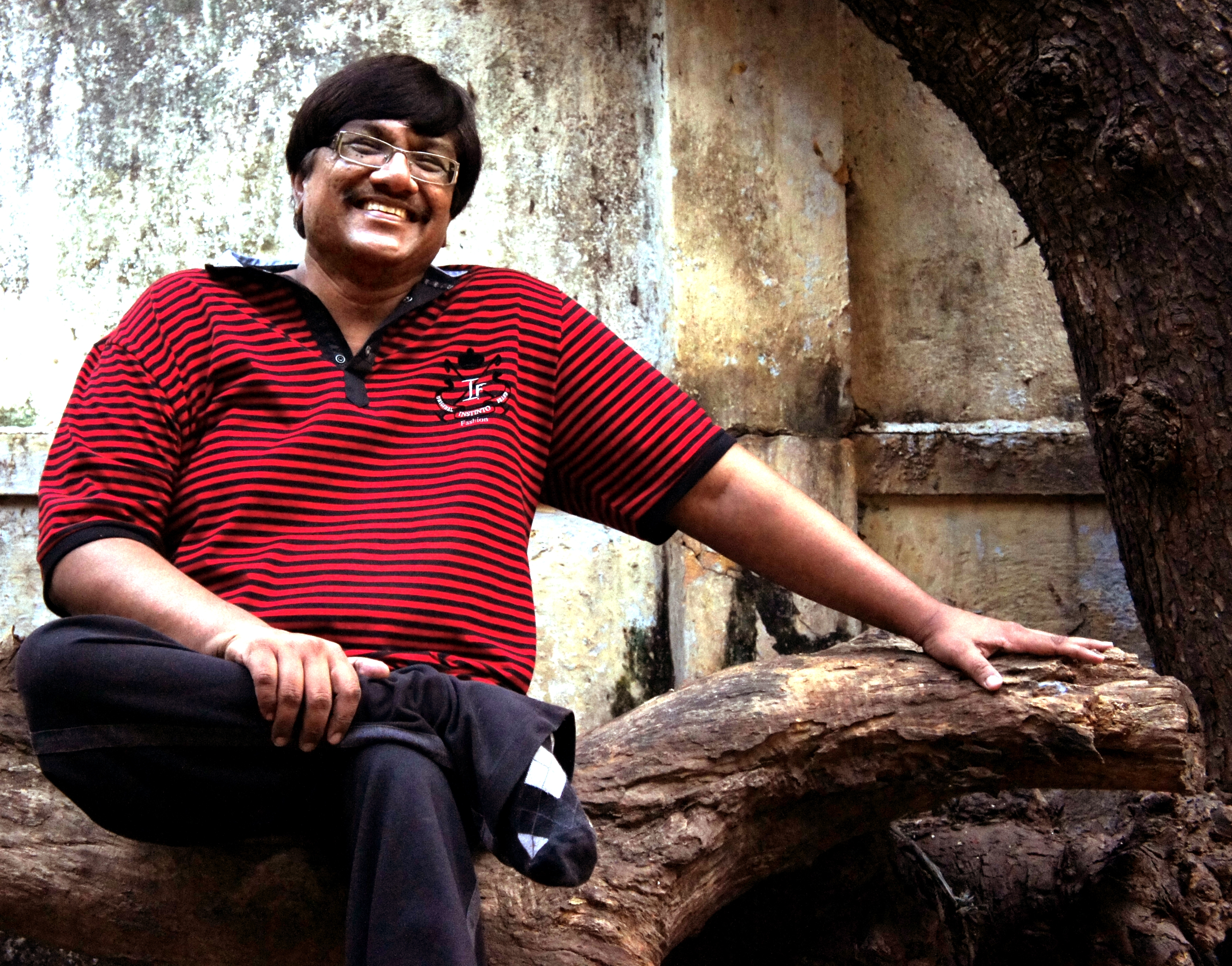
- Born: S. Abdul Hameed; 15 March 1968 (age 58); Thuvarankurichi, Tiruchirappalli district, Madras State (now Tamil Nadu), India
- Occupations: Poet, Lyricist, Writer, Social activist, Publisher, Editor, Founder of Uyirmmai publication and magazine.
- Writing career
- Pen name: Manushya Puthiran
- Genres: Modern poetry, Poetic Novel
- Subjects: Modern poetries on Social issues, Personal emotions, Intimate themes and Romanticism
- Notable works: Pasitha Pozhuthu (2011), Adheethathin Rusi(2009), Anniya Nilaththin pen(2014), Neeralaanadhu(2002), Thithikaadhe(2016), Nooru Pournamigalin Velicham(2017), Miss You (2022)
- Notable awards: Sanskriti Samman (2002) - Indian Government award for Young Poets Recognized in India Today's list of top 10 influential people in Tamil Nadu (2010, 2011) Awarded by Canada Tamil Ilakkiya Thottam for 'Adheethathin Rusi' poem collection (2011)
- Website: uyirmmai.com

S. Abdul Hameed known by his pen name Manushya Puthiran (in Tamil: மனுஷ்ய புத்திரன்). is a renowned Indian poet, writer, and social activist from Tamil Nadu. Born on March 15, 1968, in Thuvarankurichi, Tiruchirappalli District, he has made significant contributions to Tamil literature.

== Early life and education ==
Manushya Puthiran began his schooling at the age of 7 but left school early to pursue his personal interests and physical disability. He later completed his schooling through private studies and went on to earn a Bachelor of Arts degree from Annamalalai University through distance learning programs. He also holds dual master's degrees in Mass Communication and History.

== Literary career ==
Manushya Puthiran's literary journey began in the early 1980s, and his first poem was published when he was just 16 years old. He has since contributed to various popular Tamil magazines, including Ananda Vikatan, Kumudam, Kalki, Kalachuvadu, Kungumam, and Nakkheeran. His political and topical columns are regular in Tamil periodicals such as Kungumam and Nakkheeran. He is also the founder of Uyirmmai publication and Uyirmmai magazine.

In 2010, Manushya Puthiran established the Sujatha Awards to recognize excellence in literature. His own notable works include "Pulariyin Muthangal," "Oozhiyin Thinangal," "Anniya Nilathu Pen," "Miss You " and many others. His published collections include "Nizhalgalodu Pesuvom," "Edhir Kural," "Dinosorgal Veliyeri Kondirukindrana," and more. With nearly 15,000 poems to his credit, Manushya Puthiran holds the record for the highest number of poems written by a living poet in India.

=== Poetry ===
- Nee en Vaazhvil Irundhaayaa? (2025)
- Kanneerindri Poi Vaarungal (2025)
- Halloween Dhinathil Noolagathil Oru Pei (2025)
- Indha Kodai Nammai Pirithuvidum (2025)
- Yamuna Vaazhndha Veedu (2025)
- Mayyal (2025)
- Naalai Enbadhu Unnai Kaanum Naal (2024)
- Pirivin Nooru Sambavangal (2024)
- Kaadhalin Nooru Sambavangal (2024)
- Unnai Yaarum Anaithukollavillaiya? (2023)
- Apuram Pesuren (2022)
- Azhavaikathaan Ivalavu Thooram Vandhaaya? (2022)
- Kaadhal Kadhaigalaum Avamaanathin Kadhaigalaum (2022)
- Enakku Nanjuutubavargalaithaan Eppodhum Kaadhalikiren (2022)
- Inbox Pachai Vilakkugal Innum Enna Seidhukondirukindrana? (2022)
- Mudhal Sandhippin Mudhal Mutham (2022)
- Chithirame... Chithirame... Pesakoodatha? (2022)
- Neeye En Kadaisi Pennaaga Iru (2022)
- Ennai Ninaithu Kondadharku Nandri (2022)
- Anbukaagavum Kadavulukaagavum (2022)
- Unnai Enadhu Kanneeraal Thangikolven (2022)
- Mazhaikaala Kaadhalum Kulirkaala Kaamamum (2022)
- Miss You... Indha Muraiyum Ivalavudhan Solla Mudindhadhu... (2022)
- Alexa... Nee Ennai Kaadhalikiraaya? (2021)
- Vasantham Varadha Varudam (2021)
- Anbil Oru Teaspoon Koodivittadhu (2021)
- Vaadhaiyin Kadhai (2019)
- Thesavirodha Malar (2019)
- Yovanathi Amarum Kili (2019)
- Mouna Pani (2019)
- Tharaikku Varadha Ilaigal (2019)
- Viral Yaanai (2019)
- Sneghithiyin Kaadhalargal (2019)
- Iravukku Kaikal Illai (2019)
- Theendi Vilagiya Kanam (2019)
- Oru Naalil Unadhu Paruvangal (2019)
- Marma Mutham (2018)
- Ezhunthu Vaa Thalaivaa (2018)
- Maanagara Bayangaravaathi (2018)
- Kadal Paartha Veetil Kadaisi Naalaiku (2018)
- Nooru Pournamigalin Velicham (2017)
- BiggBoss Ellavatrayum Paarthu Kondirukiraar (2017)
- Thithikaadhe (2016)
- Gandhiyudan Iravu Virundhirku Selkiren (2016)
- Irulil Nagarum Yaanai (2016)
- Pulariyin Muththangal (2016)
- Oozhiyin thinangal (2016)
- Anniya Nilathu Penn (2014)
- Suriyanuku Arugil Oru Veedu (2013)
- Arundhappadatha Koppai (2012)
- Pasitha Pozhuthu (2011)
- Itharku Munbum Itharku Piragum (2010)
- Adheethaththin Rusi (2009)
- Kadavuludan Piraarthithal(2007)
- Manalin Kathai(2004)
- Neeralaanathu (2002)
- Idamum Iruppum(1998)
- En Padukkai Araiyil Yaaro Olinthirukkiraargal (1993)
- Manushyaputhiran Kavithaigal (1983)

=== Novel ===
Thaaraavin Kaadhalargal - Poetic Novel (2022)

Oru naal vasantham (2025)

=== Literary Collections ===
- Kaathiruntha Velaiyil (2003)
- Eppothum Vaazhum Kodai (2003)
- Enna Mathiriyana Kalathil Vaazhkirom (2009)
- Dinosorgal Veliyeri Kondirukindrana (2012)
- Thondramarutha Deivam (2012)
- Edhir Kural Part 1 (2012)
- Indiargalin Poli Manasatchi (2012)
- Nizhalgal Nadantha Paathai (2013)
- Kutramum Arasiyalum (2013)
- Kai Vitta Kolaik Kadavul (2013)
- Nizhalgalodu Pesuvom (2014)
- Solgiren Adhanaal Irukiren (2017)
- Naragathirkku Pogum Paadhai (2017)
- Dravidathaal Vaazhndhom (2017)

Translations

Kisses at daybreak- Translated by Abilash Chandran

Crazy Night

== Awards ==
- Sanscrithi Sammaan(2002) – Indian Govt award for Young Poets.
- Ilakkiya Sirpi award by American Ilayakkiya Nanbarkal Kuzhi 2003.
- The Indian Ministry of Social Justice awarded him with the "Best Individual Creativity" in the year 2004.
- Received the poetry award from The Tamil Literary Garden, Canada for 'Adheethathin Rusi'
- Manushya Puthiran was chosen as one of top 10 influential people of Tamil Nadu by India Today's for the year 2011 and 2010.
- For his Adheethathin Rusi poem collection, Manushya Puthiran has been awarded by Canada Tamil Ilakkiya Thottam, in the year 2011.The Tamil Literary Garden

== Political career ==
On 19 Aug 2015, he joined the Dravida Munnetra Kazhagam (DMK). He is one of the 2 Advisors to the party's IT Wing.

== Posts ==
He was the Chairman of Chennai Local Library Authority from January 2023 to June 2026

== Views ==
He is known for his progressive views on various socio-political issues like abolition of capital punishment, caste annihilation, and women's liberation.

== Controversies ==
In 2018, Manushyaputhiran and H. Raja were involved in a war of words due to a poem written by the former. Several writers then voiced their support of Manushyaputhiran.
