= Nigar Shaji =

Indian space scientist (born 1964)

- Born: Nigar Sultana; Sengottai, Tirunelveli district, (presently in Tenkasi district Tamil Nadu), India
- Education: SRM Government Girls Higher Secondary School, Shencottah; Bachelor in Electronics and Communications, Government College of Engineering, Tirunelveli; Masters in Electronics, Birla Institute of Technology, Mesra
- Occupation: Space scientist
- Employer: ISRO
- Known for: Project director of Aditya-L1 Associate project director Resourcesat-2A
- Parent(s): Sheikh Meeran (father), Saitoon Beevi (mother)

Nigar Shaji (born 1964) is an Indian aerospace engineer who works at Indian Space Research Organisation (ISRO), India's national space agency.

== Early life and education ==
Nigar Shaji was born Nigar Sultana to a Tamil Muslim family. Her father, Sheikh Meeran, was a farmer, and her mother, Sythoon Beevi, is a homemaker. Shaji was raised in Sengottai, in the Tenkasi district of Tamil Nadu. She did her schooling in an SRM Government Girls Higher secondary school in Sengottai before going to the Government College of Engineering, Tirunelveli Madurai Kamaraj University, where she earned an engineering degree in electronics and communications. She went on to earn a master's degree in electronics from Birla Institute of Technology, Mesra. She has a brother, Sheik Saleem.

== Career ==
Nigar Shaji joined ISRO in 1987 as part of the U R Rao Satellite Centre. She has worked on multiple satellite programmes, including serving as study director for India's proposed mission to Venus, which she spoke about in 2012. She was the Associate Project Director of Resourcesat-2A. As of 2023, she is the project director of Aditya-L1, India's first solar mission, which launched successfully on 2 September 2023.

== Awards and honors ==
In 2023, Times Now recognized Shaji and P Veeramuthuvel for their "contributions to India's space endeavors", and she was given the 'Eve of Excellence' honor by Tiruchirappalli Regional Engineering College.

== Personal life ==
Nigar Shaji lives in Bangalore with her mother and daughter. Her husband works in Dubai.
