= Gulam Kadir Navalar =

Tamil poet

Fourth Nakkeerar Ghulam Kadiru Navalar
- Born: 1833; Nagore, Tamilnadu
- Died: 23 January 1908
- Occupation: Poet
- Spouse: Makdoom kani Ammal
- Parent: Ayurveda Bhaskara Panditha Vappu Rowther (father)

Kulāmkātir̲u Nāvalar (1833–1908) was a Tamil poet. He was proficient in Tamil, Arabic and English. He wrote a wide range of literature, including poems, prose literature, three literary translations, two grammar books, and two other texts. His books were nationalized by the Tamil Nadu government in 2007. He composed many types of literature including Kappiyams, Kalambakams, Koivas, Anthadis, Malas, and text books. He was the first to bring the history of Nagor Nayak into a book (Kanjul Karamathu). One of his best students was Thiramalai Adigalar.

== Early life ==
Ghulam Kathiru was born in 1833 to the affluent Tamil Rowther family in Nagore. His father was Ayurveda Bhaskara Panditha Vappu Rowther. His ancestors came from Ramanathapuram district and settled in Nagore.

== Works ==
- Kansool Karamattu
- Nagore Puranam
- Maturaikkōvai
- Maturait Tamil̲c Caṅkattup pulavarār̲r̲uppaṭai
- Āripunāyaka vacan̲am
- Pulavaraatrupadai
- Arabic Tamil Dictionary
- Mustafa maalai
- Umar basha yuddha sarithiram, Reynolds tamilization
- Porundhaa ilakkanam

== Sources ==
- International Registration Number : 81-88023-10 .
