= Kombai Anwar =

Tamil filmmaker

Kombai Anwar is an academic and Tamil documentary filmmaker. His documentary Yaadhum, based on the history and cultural identity of Tamil Muslims, won the Bronze Remi Award at the 48th WorldFest-Houston International Film and Video Festival, USA. Yaadhum was also screened at The Hindu Literary Festival, Roja Muthiah Research Library, and ViBGYOR Film Festival.
