= Kajamian Rowther =

Indian Freedom fighter

Khan Sahib N.M. Kajamian Rowther
- Born: 1880; Palakkarai, Trichinopoly, Madras Presidency
- Died: 14 November 1954 (aged 74)
- Occupation(s): Politician, businessman and philanthropist
- Parent: N. Mohamed Mian Rowther (father)

Khan Sahib N.M.Kajamian Rowther was a prominent businessman, Indian freedom fighter, educationalist and philanthropist from Trichinopoly. He was born in 1880 to Mr. N. Mohamed Mian Rowther, a wealthy landlord in trichinopoly. He succeeded his father's business and improved the tannery with modern enhancements and also took part actively in Khilafat Movement. He was a treasurer in Tamil Nadu Provincial Congress Committee, Trichinopoly.

== Early life ==
Janab N.M.Kaja Mian Rowther born in 1880 into Aristocrat Rowther family at palakkarai, Trichinopoly, Madras presidency, British India. his father N. Mohamed Mian Rowther was Wealthy Landlord in Trichinopoly.

== Jamal Mohamed College ==
Jamal Mohamed College was established in 1951 as a religious minority institution with the primary objective of providing higher education to the downtrodden and socially backward sections of the society in general and Muslim Minority in particular. Janab. N.M. Khajamian Rowther Sahib and Janab. M. Jamal Mohamed Sahib of revered memory are the founding fathers of this institution.

Ever since its inception in 1951, it has been rendering signal service to the cause of education, primary and secondary. To facilitate the efforts of this Society, the late Janab Khaja Mian Rowther donated to it about 110 acres of land near the Race Course, Tiruchi, and the late Hajee M. Jamal Mohideen Saheb, a leading business magnate,

The original inspiration for starting the college came from the philanthropic disposition of the late Janab Kaja Mian Rowther, a leading business magnate, who was the President of Majlis-ul-uiema (ihe assembly of the learned) till his death in 1954.
