= P. Dawood Shah =

Tamil poet

- Born: 29 March 1885; Tanjore district, Madras Presidency, British India (now Thanjavur district, Tamil Nadu, India)
- Died: 24 February 1969 (aged 83); Madras (now Chennai), Tamil Nadu, India
- Education: Government Arts College, Kumbakonam
- Occupations: Tamil scholar and activist
- Notable work: translating Quran into Tamil
- Awards: gold medal, Madurai Tamil Sangam

P. Dawood Shah (29 March 1885 – 24 February 1969) was a Tamil enthusiast and scholar, activist and a gold medalist from Madurai Tamil Sangam. He also known as "Kamba Ramayana Sahib".

== Early life ==
Dawood Shah was born to Pappu Rowther and Kulzum Biwi on 29 March 1885, in Tanjore district, Madras Presidency, British India (present day Thanjavur district, Tamil Nadu, India). He had his early education in Government Arts College, Kumbakonam. His classmate was a mathematics genius Ramanujan in tanjore and his Tamil teacher was the famous Tamil scholar U.V. Swaminatha Iyer.

== Career ==
P. Dawood Shah loved the Tamil language and won a gold medal from the Madurai Tamil Sangam. He strongly advocated the replacement of Arabic with Tamil in mosques and led a campaign. He was the first person to translate the Quran into Tamil and served as the editor of the Tamil magazine Darul Islam.

== Death ==
He died on 24 February 1969 in Madras (now Chennai, the capital of Tamil Nadu), just a month before his 84th birthday.
