= Kadayanallur =

Kadayanallur Nickname: Jewel's city
- Town
- Kadayanallur, Tamil Nadu
- Coordinates: 9.0779°N 77.3452°E
- Country: India
- State: Tamil Nadu
- District: Tenkasi
- Taluk: Kadayanallur

Government
  - Type: First grade municipality
  - Body: Kadayanallur Municipality
- Elevation: 217 m (712 ft)

Population
  - Total: 90,364 (2,011)

Languages
  - Official: Tamil
- Time zone: UTC+5:30 (IST)
- PIN: 627751, 627759
- Vehicle registration: TN-76
- Website: www.kdnl.org

Kadayanallur is a town in Tenkasi district, Tamil Nadu, India. Kadayanallur is approximately 16 km from the town of Tenkasi, the district headquarters. With an area of 52 square kilometres and a population of 90,364, Kadayanallur is classified as a First Grade Municipality under Tamil Nadu's municipal Code. Kadayanallur is the largest city in the district.

== Etymology ==
The name Kadayanallur comes from "Kadaikaaleeswara", the name of the presiding deity of Kadayaleeswarar kovil, a Hindu temple in Kadayanallur.

== Geography ==
The town is at the foot of the Western Ghats and has an average elevation of 191 m (627 ft). The town is surrounded by the Western Ghats on three sides and lies on the Madurai–Kollam highway.

The city is surrounded by paddy fields, coconut farms, and many ponds. A small river flows in the middle of the city. There are some rocky regions on the western end of the city known locally as 'parumbu'. The town's ponds include Attakulam, Paloorani, Thamaraikulam, Annamalai Peri and Paatiyuthukulam, and the largest, Periyakulam.

The town has an area of 52.25 km^{2} (20.17 sq mi). It is about 16 km north of Tenkasi, 18 km north of Courtallam, and 47 km south of Rajapalayam. National Highway 208 (Kollam–Thirumangalam) passes through the town. It in general has a dry climate except during the monsoon.

== Climate ==
Kadayanallur's climate is classified as tropical. The summers here have a good deal of rainfall, while the winters have very little. According to Köppen and Geiger, this climate is classified as Aw. The average annual temperature is 27.3 °C in Kadayanallur. The average annual rainfall is 1,206 mm. The South West Monsoon brings in the cold breeze with mild temperature. From October to December, the North East Monsoon sets over in Tamil Nadu and the climate is cold and the rains are sometimes very heavy.

Climate data for Kadayanallur, Tamil Nadu
Month	Jan	Feb	Mar	Apr	May	Jun	Jul	Aug	Sep	Oct	Nov	Dec	Year
Mean daily maximum °C (°F)	29.7 (85.5)	31.2 (88.2)	32.9 (91.2)	33.3 (91.9)	33.5 (92.3)	32.0 (89.6)	31.0 (87.8)	31.3 (88.3)	31.6 (88.9)	30.7 (87.3)	29.3 (84.7)	29.1 (84.4)	31.3 (88.3)
Mean daily minimum °C (°F)	21.3 (70.3)	21.9 (71.4)	23.4 (74.1)	24.7 (76.5)	25.2 (77.4)	24.6 (76.3)	24.1 (75.4)	24.1 (75.4)	23.8 (74.8)	23.4 (74.1)	22.6 (72.7)	21.6 (70.9)	23.4 (74.1)
Average precipitation mm (inches)	41 (1.6)	36 (1.4)	63 (2.5)	100 (3.9)	81 (3.2)	116 (4.6)	113 (4.4)	61 (2.4)	68 (2.7)	219 (8.6)	212 (8.3)	96 (3.8)	1,206 (47.4)
Source: Climate-Data.org

== Demographics ==
Religious census
Religion	Percent(%)
Hindu	55.98%
Muslim	43.42%
Christian	0.48%
Other	0.1%

According to the 2011 census of India, Kadayanallur Municipality had a population of 90,364 with 45,449 males and 44,915 females. This yields a sex-ratio of 988 females for every 1,000 males. This sex-ratio is higher than the state of Tamil Nadu (917), and the Indian average (907) as a whole.

The population by religious community table indicates that Kadayanallur has 45,586 Hindus, 39,235 Muslims, 437 Christians, 13 following other religions, and 93 persons with "religion not stated." This yields a percentage distribution of approximately 55.98% Hindus, 43.41% Muslims, 0.48% Christians, 0.01% following other religions, and 0.1% with "religion not stated."

A total of 9,810 were under the age of six, constituting 4,889 males and 4,921 females. Scheduled Castes and Scheduled Tribes accounted for 13.64% and 0.42% of the population respectively. The average literacy was 71.8%, compared to the national average of 72.99%.

The town had 21,076 households. There were 34,039 workers, comprising 927 cultivators, 6,839 main agricultural labourers, 3,176 in household industries, 20,095 other workers, 3,002 marginal workers, 34 marginal cultivators, 390 marginal agricultural labourers, 569 marginal workers in household industries, and 2,009 other marginal workers.

== Government and politics ==
=== Amenities ===
The Indian Postal Service Pincode is 627751 (Bazaar), 627759 (Krishnapuram). The Telecom Code (BSNL) is 04633.

== Economy ==
The town is known for its textile industry. It is also known for its saaral (drizzle), which occurs from May to August. It is known for its vast paddy and coconut fields.

Most of the last generation of residents were farmers and weavers; however, many are now employed around India and in countries such as the Middle East, Singapore, Malaysia.

More recently, the town has developed a gold and jewellery trade.

== Cityscape ==
=== Tourism ===
The main tourist attractions of the city are the Karuppanadhi dam, the Kallaru river, Periyaru river, Periya Pallivasal, Pettai Pallivasal, Arulmigu Abhayagastha Anjaneyar Temple, Kookaruvi falls at the top of hills, Kannimariyamman Temple Krishnan Kovil, and the Bathrakaliamman Kovil.

== Transport ==
=== By Rail ===
Kadayanallur Railway station is situated in Kadayanallur, Tamil Nadu. Station code of Kadayanallur is KDNL. Trains serving the station include the Pothigai Express and the Silambu Express.

=== By Bus ===
SETC Bus Service is available from the Kadayanallur New Bus Stand to all major locations in Tamil Nadu. All Major Private Omni Bus have daily services connecting Kadayanallur and Chennai, Bangalore.

=== By Air ===
The nearest airports are:

- Tuticorin Airport (101 km or 66 miles)
- Trivandrum International Airport (123 km or 76 miles)
- Madurai Airport (141 km or 87 miles)
- Cochin International Airport (258 km (160 mi))
