= Muslim Educational Society =

Indian educational organisation

- Marampally College
- Founded: 1964
- Founder: Dr. P. K. Abdul Gafoor
- Type: Educational
- Location: Kozhikode, Kerala, India
- Region served: Kerala, India
- Key people: P.A. Fazal Ghafoor (President); P.O.J. Lebba (General Secretary
- Website: Official Website

The Muslim Educational Society is an educational organisation established in 1964.

The society operates 150 educational facilities across Kerala, which include 28 colleges, 12 secondary schools and 36 Central Board of Secondary Education schools and has over 100,000 students. In 2019, the society banned face veils from its facilities, a decision that caused controversy.

== Colleges ==
Aided

1. Dr. Gafoor Memorial MES College Mampad, Malappuram.
2. MES Ponnani College Ponnani South, Malappuram.
3. MES Keveeyem College Valanchery, Malappuram.
4. MES Kalladi College Mannarkkad, Palakkad.
5. MES Asmabi College Kodungallur, Thrissur.
6. MES College Marampilly, Ernakulam.
7. MES College Nedumkandam, Idukki.

== See also ==
- Dr. Gafoor Memorial MES Mampad College
- M.E.S. Ponnani College, Ponnani
- MEA Engineering College, Perinthalmanna
- MES Asmabi College
- MES Keveeyam College, Valanchery
- MES College Marampally, Aluva
