= Pulavar =

Pulavar is a name. People with the name include:

- Umaru Pulavar
- Pulavar K. Govindan
- K. K. Ramachandra Pulavar
- Pulavar Pulamaipithan
- Pulavar Kuzhanthai
- Kumaraswamy Pulavar
- Padikasu Pulavar
- Rajeev Pulavar
- Nadipisai Pulavar

== See also ==
- Pulavar (film), a 2026 Indian film
- Umar Pulavar Tamil Language Centre
