= Tamil Muslim =

Religious-ethnic group

Tamil Muslims தமிழ் முஸ்லிம்கள்
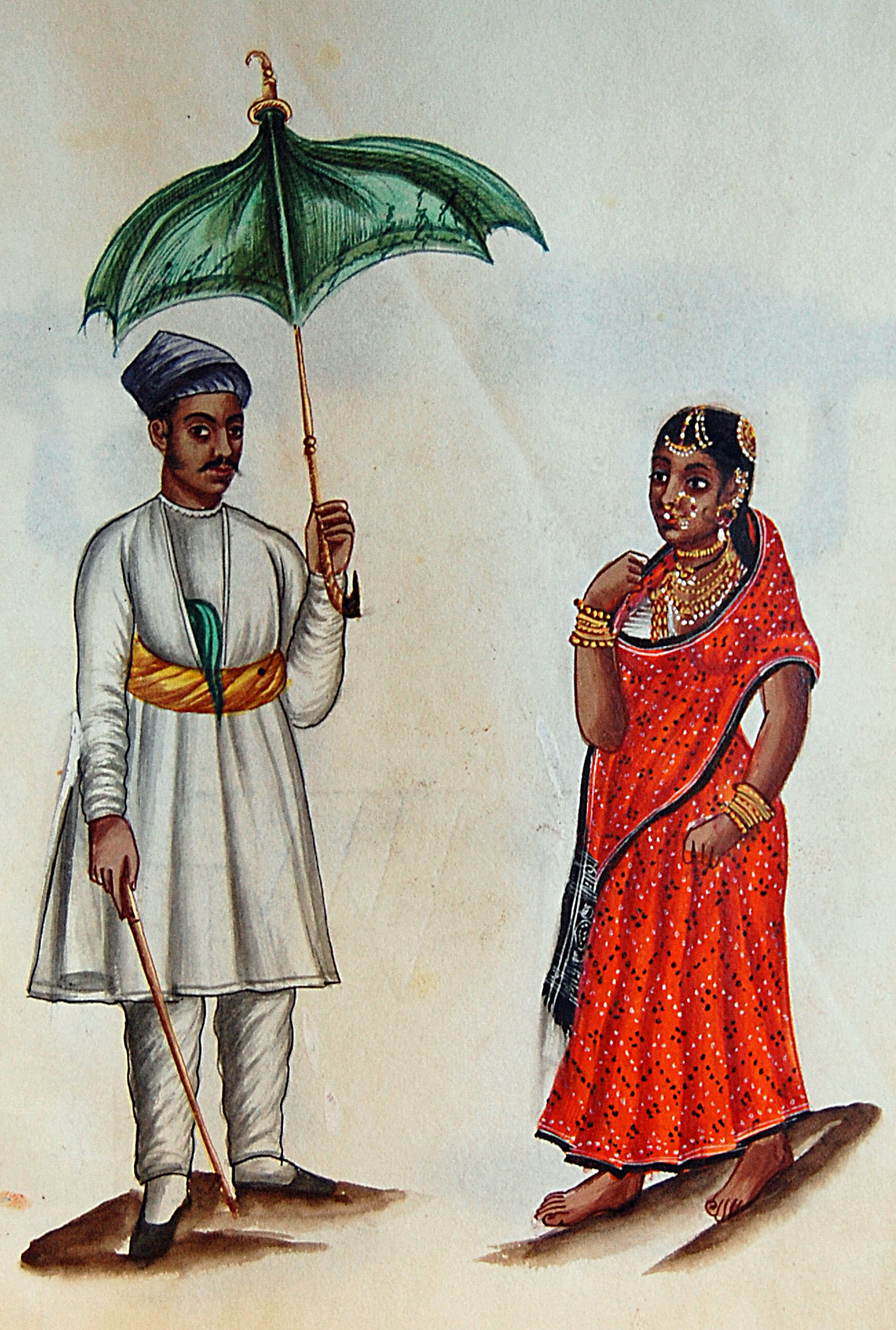
- Rowthers of Madras Presidency in 1830

Total population
- c. 10 million

Regions with significant populations
- Peninsular India, Maritime Southeast Asia, Arabian Peninsula, Western Europe, North America

Religions
- Islam (Sect – Sunni, Madhab – Majority Shafi'i)

Languages
- Tamil

Tamil Muslims are Tamils who practise Islam. The community is 10 million in India, primarily in the state of Tamil Nadu where 90% of the Muslim community identified themselves as Tamil Muslims. In Tamil Nadu, the majority of Tamil-speaking Muslims belong to the Rowthers Community while other Muslims live in coastal Tamil Nadu. There is a substantial diaspora, particularly in Southeast Asia, which has seen their presence as early as the 13th century. In the late 20th century, the diaspora expanded to Western Europe, Persian Gulf and North America.

== Ethnic identity ==
A typical minaret of a mosque in Tamil Nadu as seen here of Erwadi in Ramanathapuram District

Though numerically nominal, the community is not homogeneous. Its origin is shaped by centuries trade between the Bay of Bengal and the Maritime Southeast Asia. By the 20th century, certain Tamil races began to be listed as social classes in official gazettes of different clans as Rowther, Marakkar, and Labbay.

=== Rowther ===
The Rowther community is a large population of Muslim landowning community in the deltaic districts and Southern districts of Tamil Nadu. They were famous for their cavalry and horse trade. Politicians Quaid-e-Millath, Dewan Khan Bahadur Khalifulla Sahib (he was the first Muslim from Madras Presidency go to London for studies), Karim Ghani veteran freedom fighter and a close associate of Netaji Subash Chandra Bose, First woman judge of Supreme court of India Fathima Beevi, Poets like Umaru Pulavar, Kunangudi Masthan Sahib, Fourth Nakkeerar Gulam Kadir Navalar, Dawood Shah all are from Rowther Community. Rowthers constitute large part of the multi-ethnic Tamil Muslim community. Ravuttars have also been found as Tamil polygars, zamindars and chieftains from the 16th to 18th centuries. Traditionally, they were known as Maravars, but after the arrival of Islam, they transformed into horseback warriors, hence adopting the Tamil name Rowther. The traditional homelands of the Rowthers were in the interior of South Tamilakam.

=== Marakkayar ===
The Marakkar sect has been a maritime trading community in the southern districts of Tamil Nadu. One notable sea-faring merchant, as recorded in the Chronicles of Thondaiman, was Periya Thambi Nainar Marakkayar who is widely believed to be the first rupee millionaire. His son Seethakaathi, an altruist. B. S. Abdur Rahman was the first rupee billionaire Marakkayar. The 11th president of India A. P. J. Abdul Kalam was also born in Marakkayar fisherman family.

=== Labbay ===
Similar to the Jewish Levite, the Labbay sect mainly engages in religious scholarship and avoids entrepreneurial activities.

== Economy ==
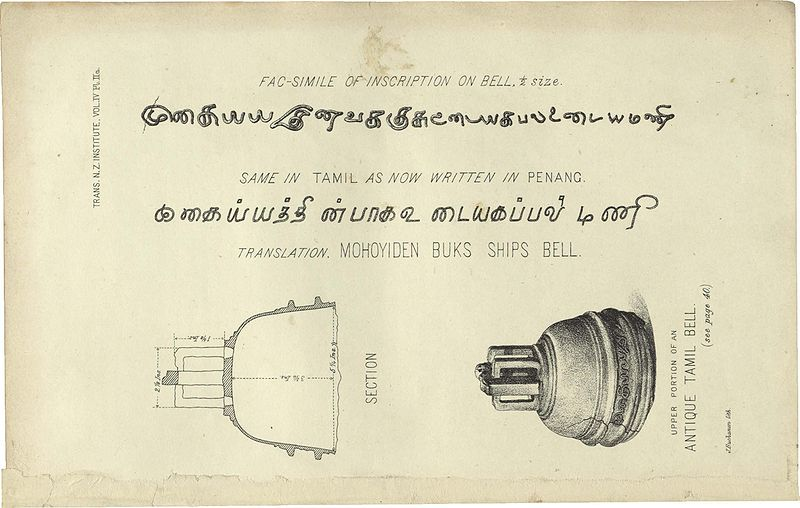
Tamil Bell with its inscription and translation

In Tamil Nadu, the community is well known as rentiers, entrepreneurs, gemstone jewellers and money changers with above State-average GDP per capita incomes.

== Culture ==
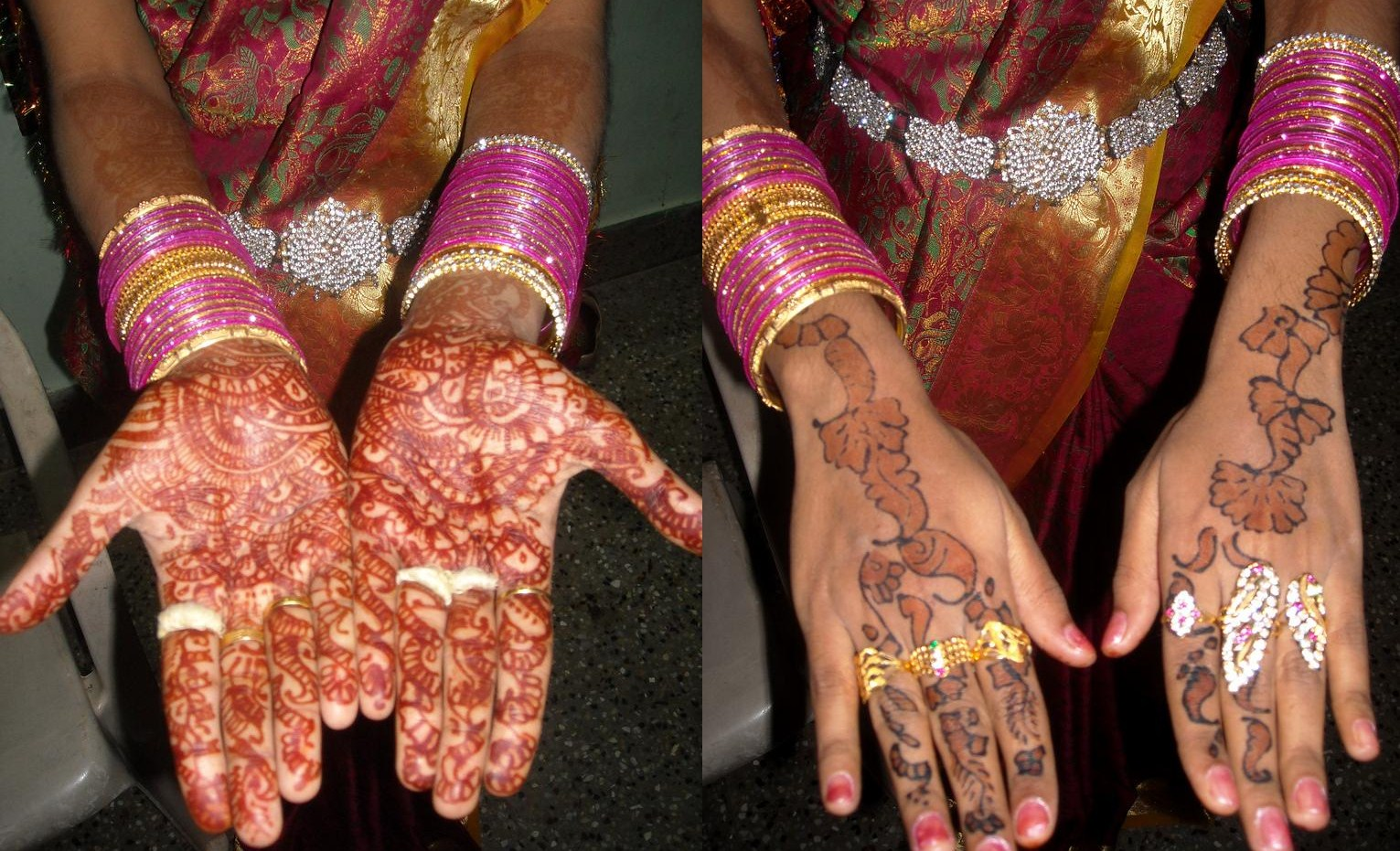
Henna on a saree-clad bride's hands, Tamil Nadu, India.

=== Legends and rituals ===
As a mark of modesty, women used to traditionally wear white thuppatti which is draped over their body on top of the saree, only revealing their face. However, due to cultural exchange and evolving trends, nowadays, most women wear an Abaya, which is usually black in color, paired with a headscarf, as Purdah.

Many visit Dargahs and Masjids on major life milestones like births, marriages and deaths and recite mawlid.

Keelakarai Jumma Masjid, built in the 7th century, with prominent Dravidian architecture, is one of the oldest mosques in Asia

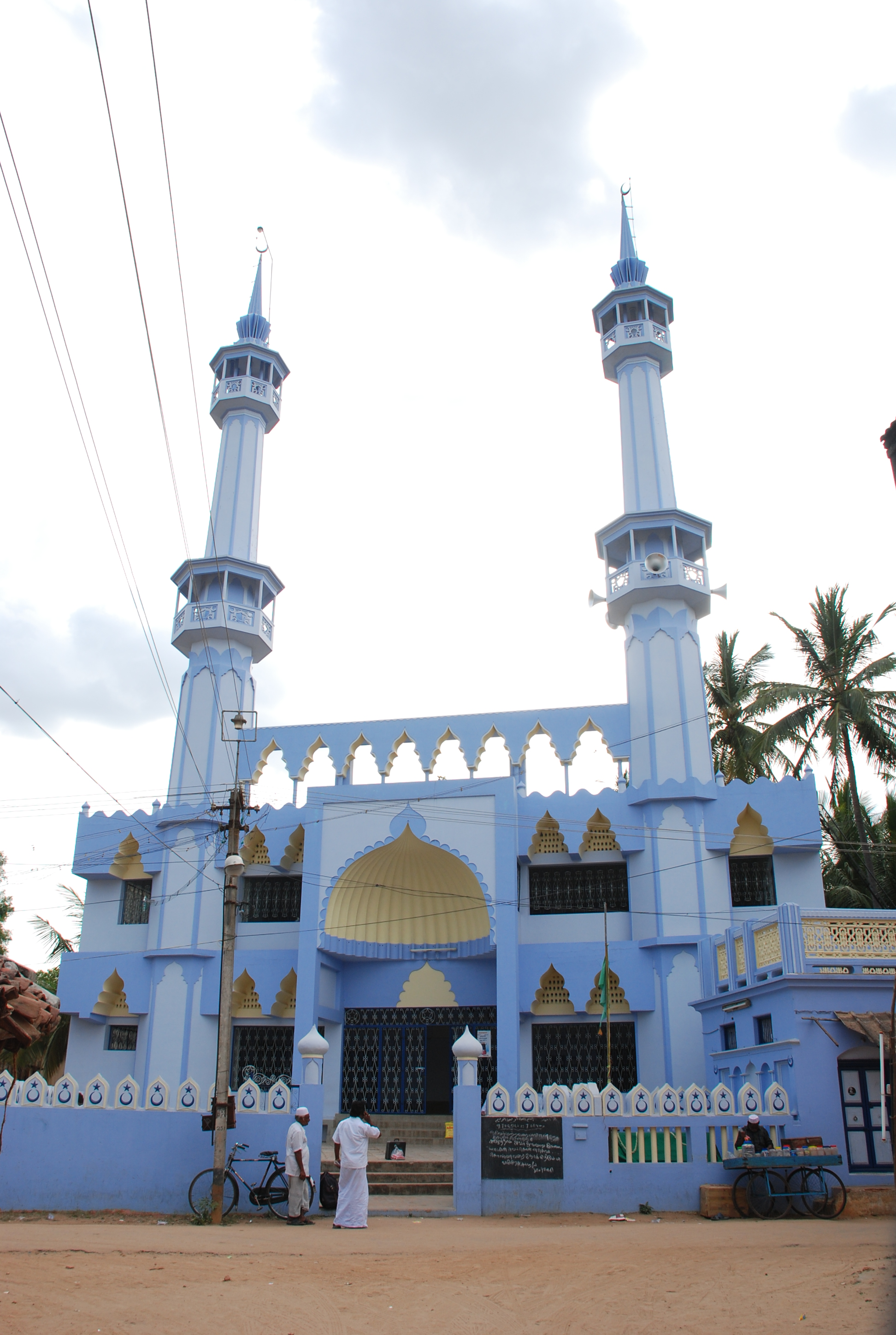
Muhyuddin Andavar Mosque, in the village of Thiruppanandal, Thanjavur District, Tamil Nadu

Rowther weddings have retained several Rajput traditions across generations like grooms going on a horseback procession. Surnames (identifying caste or tribe like Bohra, Bukhari, Chishti, Khan, Syed, Sahib, Shah, etc.) were positively discouraged by the community to avoid sectarianism in line with Dravidian reform movement of the 20th century.

=== Art ===
Music involves distinctively the Turkish daf and other percussion instruments.

=== Cuisine ===
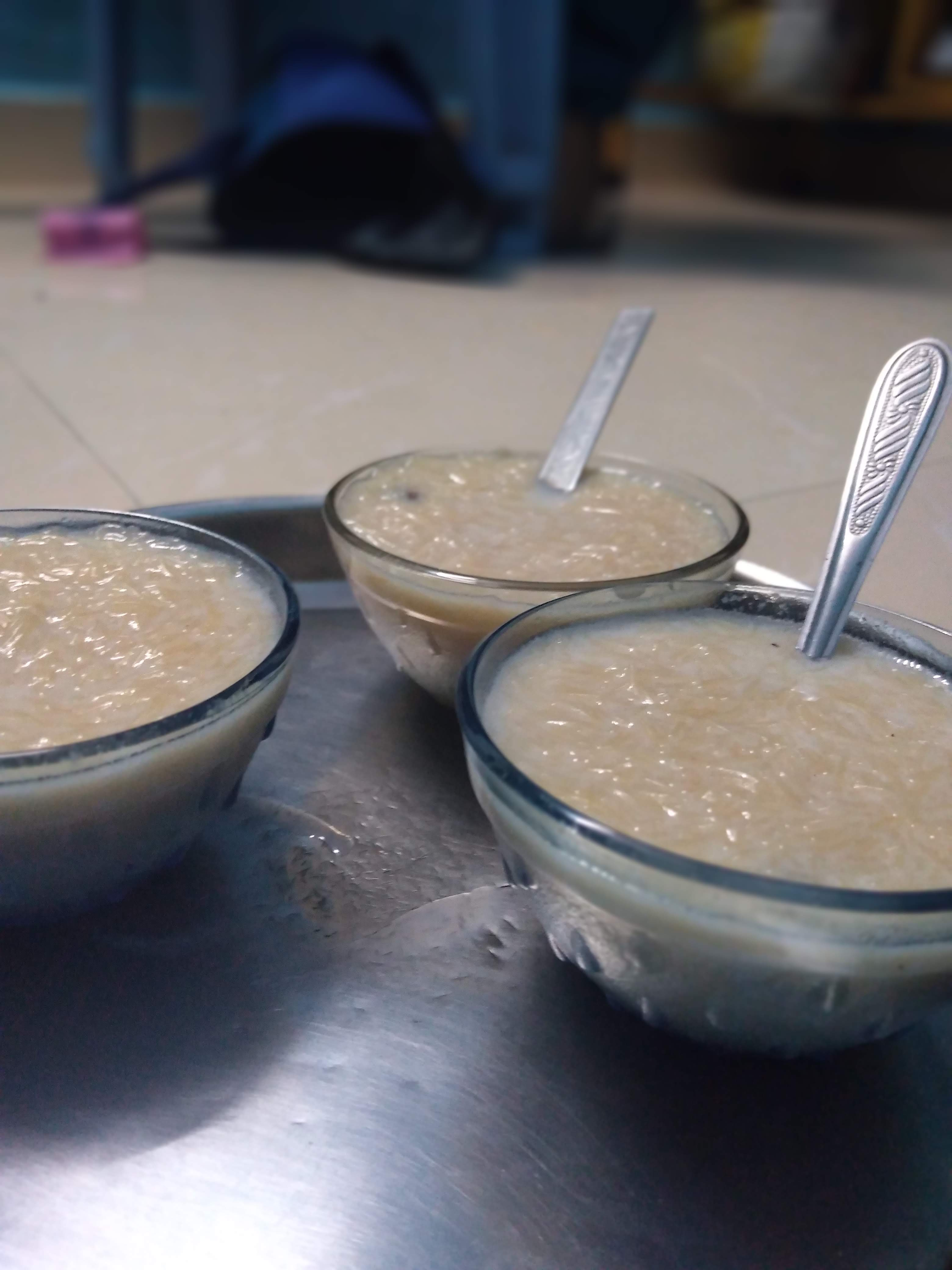
Tamil Muslim Payasam during Ramadan

Cuisine is a tell-tale syncretic mixture of Tamil and other Asian recipes.

Biriyani, especially Rawther Style Biryani, the ones made out of mutton, is the favorite in special occasions, particularly during wedding banquets and during Eid festivities. It is made by Seeraga Samba rice. In a typical Tamil Muslim Wedding, a Mutton Biryani is served, along with Raitha, Brinjal Chutney, Chicken 65, with desserts usually being either Bread Halwa (which is a molten variant of the Hyderabadi Double ka Meetha and the North Indian and Pakistani Shahi Tukda) or Rava Kesari, along with Sweet Beeda. Phirni and 'Inippu Soru' while rarer, are also served as desserts in some weddings.

Ghee rice, served usually with a Dalcha or any other meat-based gravy is also a sought-after dish, usually prepared during Jummah or during other special occasions. In Deltaic Regions, for wedding ceremonies, a dish by the name of 'Anju Kari Soru' (roughly translates to 'Five Gravy Rice') is served. This spread includes Ghee rice, Dalcha, a Chicken-based gravy ('aanam' in Tamil), a Mutton-based gravy, a stir-fry made out of Mutton Liver, and a jam and banana combo mixed along with the rice as dessert. However, due to the rise of popularity in Biryani, this has increasingly become a rare spread.

During the month of Ramadan, the 'Nonbu Kanji' is a staple for breaking the fast in Iftar, served for free in almost every masjid in the state. Other snacks and delicacies that are popular during this month are Vadai, Samosa, Sharbath-based beverages, and a jelly-like dessert made out of Agar-Agar ('China Grass', called 'Kadal Paasi' in Tamil) and milk.

Desserts include the Dumroot, a semolina ('rava' in Tamil) ghee cake with soft center and hard crust at the top, is popular in the Rowther households. Watlappam, is another dessert, a pudding, popular in Marakkayer households. Dodol is another halwa-based dessert, originally persumed to have come from Southeast Asia. Along with Bread Halwa, Rava Kesari, Phirni, Inippu Soru, and Payasam made out of Vermicelli.

Other delicacies include, Idiyappam and Parotta, both of which are usually served with gravies (usually meat-based), usually had for either breakfast or for dinner. Chicken 65, a popular fried starter, usually had with Biryani, is widely believed to have been invented by Buhari Hotel (Anna Salai, Chennai 600 002), whose founder was from Tirunelveli. Mini Samosas, stuffed with minced (kheema) meat are also popular snack items. Murtabak is a meat-based stuffed parotta dish, originally speculated to have been brought from Yemen, and which eventually spread to South East Asian countries.

During Eid, breakfast usually includes Idli or Idiyappam with a mutton gravy, and payasam.

=== Literature ===
Culture and literature are heavily influenced by the Qadiri flavour of Sufism. Their domain range from mystical to medical, from fictional to political, from philosophical to legal and spiritual.

The earliest literary works in the community could be traced to Palsanthmalai, a work of eight stanzas written in the 13th century. In 1572, Seyku Issaku, better known as Vanna Parimala Pulavar, published Aayira Masala Venru Vazhankum Adisaya Puranam detailing the Islamic principles and beliefs in a FAQ format. In 1592, Aali Pulavar wrote the Mikurasu Malai. The epic Seera Puranam by Umaru Pulavar is dated to the 17th century and still considered as the crowning achievement in canonical literature. Other significant works of 17th century include Thiruneri Neetham by Sufi master Pir Mohammad, Kanakabhisheka Malai by Seyku Nainar (alias Kanakavirayar), Tirumana Katchi by Sekathi Nainar and the Iraqi war ballad Sackoon Pataippor.

Nevertheless, an independent identity evolved only in the last quarter of the 20th century triggered by the rise of Dravidian politics as well as the introduction of new mass communications and lithographic technologies. The world's first Tamil Islamic Literature Conference was held in Trichy in 1973. In the early 2000s, the Department of Tamil Islamic Literature was set up in the University of Madras. Modern notable writers include Mu. Metha and Pavalar Inqulab,

== Role in politics ==
=== Pre-independence ===
Kalifulla Shahib served as the minister for public works in the Cabinet of Kurma Venkata Reddy Naidu in 1937. He was sympathetic to the cause of Periyar E. V. Ramasamy and his Self-Respect Movement. He spoke against the introduction of compulsory Hindi classes in the Madras legislature and participated in the anti-Hindi agitations. He was a lawyer by profession and was known by the honorifics Khan Bahadur. He became the Dewan of Pudukottai after withdrawal from political work. Mohammad Usman was the most prominent among the early political leaders of the community. In 1930, Jamal Mohammad Rowther became the president of the Madras Presidency Muslim League. Yakub Hasan Sait served as a minister in the Rajaji administration. Karim Ghani, veteran freedom fighter and a close associate of Subash Chandra Bose, who hailed from Ilayangudi, served as Information Minister in Netaji ministry during the 1930s.

=== Post-independence ===
Since the late 20th century, politicians like Muhammad Ismail Rowther (founder of Indian Union Muslim League) and Dawood Shah advocated Tamil to be made an official language of India due to its antiquity in parliamentary debates The community was united in a single political party under Quaid-e-Millath presidency for 27 years keeping rabble-rousers away until his death in 1972. His support was invaluable for ruling parties in the state, as well as in the Centre. He was instrumental in framing and obtaining the minority status and privileges for minorities in India thus safeguarding the Constitution of India. His newspaper Urimaikkural was a very popular daily.

S. M. Abdul Majid Sahib is an Indian politician and former member of Legistative Assembly. He served as the local Administration Minister in the Kamaraj ministry 1962 and 1963. S. M. Muhammed Sheriff was the first elected IUML MP from Tamil Nadu. He produced clear documentary evidence that Kachchatheevu belonged to India. During the Emergency, he was the advisor to the Governor. M. M. Ismail became Chief Justice in 1979 and was sworn in as Acting Governor of Tamil Nadu in 1980. As Kamban Kazhagam president, he organized literary festivals, that focused on classical Tamil literature. Justice S. A. Kader who was the Judge of Madras High Court during 1983–89 became the President of Tamil Nadu State Government Consumer Disputes Redressal Commission on retirement. In the early 1990s, the Indian National League split from the IUML. The non-denominational social reform movements (called Ghair Muqallid) began to take the front stage (to fight superstition creep) spearheaded by P. Jainulabdeen further weakening the IUML and causing unrest among community elders who preferred status quo. Nevertheless, the Tamil Nadu Muslim Munnetra Kazagham was constituted in 1995. This non-profit organization quickly became popular and assertive among the working class youth.

=== 21st century ===
In 2009, the Manithaneya Makkal Katchi, the political arm of TMMK was formed. The TMMK itself split to form the break-away organisation Tamil Nadu Thowheed Jamath soon. In 2011, MMK won 2 of 3 contested Assembly seats viz. Ambur (A. Aslam Basha) and Ramanathapuram (M. H. Jawahirullah). Broadly speaking, the community tends to support laissez faire and free trade; and have been unimpressed by Communism as a public policy though fringe groups often called for affirmative action in the last quarter of the 20th century. New generation of leaders like Daud Sharifa Khanum have been active in pioneering social reforms like independent mosques for women. MLAs and MPs such as A. Anwar Rhazza, J. M. Aaroon Rashid, Abdul Rahman, Jinna, Khaleelur Rahman, S. N. M. Ubayadullah, Hassan Ali and T. P. M. Mohideen Khan are found across all major Dravidian political parties like DMK, DMDK and AIADMK, as well as national parties like the INC.

== See also ==
- Tamil Muslim population by cities
- Seera Puranam – Islamic Tamil epic
