= Seera Puranam =

Tamil epic poem

- Author: Umaru Pulavar
- Original title: சீறாப்புராணம்
- Language: Tamil
- Subject: Islamic literature
- Genre: Biography, Poetry
- Published: 17th century
- Publication place: India

Seera Puranam (Tamil: சீறாப்புராணம்) is a 17th-century Tamil literary work written by the Rowther Tamil poet Umaru Pulavar, which narrates the life and teachings of the Islamic prophet Muhammad. It is regarded as a significant contribution to Tamil Islamic literature and is known for its poetic rendition of religious themes. It is considered one of the earliest Islamic literary works in Tamil, exemplifying the synthesis of Tamil and Islamic literary traditions that characterized South Indian literature during the medieval period.

== Historical context ==
The composition of Seera Puranam occurred in a period marked by increased interaction between South Indian cultures and Islamic influences, largely through trade and cultural exchange. Tamil Nadu, with its long history of trade, had established connections with the Persian world, which facilitated the growth of a Tamil Muslim community. This exchange led to the emergence of Tamil Islamic literature, of which Seera Puranam is a prominent example. Umaru Pulavar composed this work to communicate the ideals and teachings of Islam in a way that resonated with Tamil-speaking Muslims and fostered greater understanding among non-Muslim Tamils.

== Literary style and structure ==
Seera Puranam follows a classical Tamil poetic form known as viruttam, a meter commonly used in Tamil devotional literature. The text is organized into multiple cantos, each detailing significant events in the life of Prophet Muhammad. The poem’s verses describe key episodes in Muhammad’s life, with themes of faith, resilience, and moral integrity. The structure follows a classical Tamil style, using elaborate language to appeal to both Tamil-speaking Muslims and broader audiences interested in religious literature. The text also highlights important battles, such as the Battle of Badr and the Battle of Uhud, depicting them as moments of divine support and moral trials. The final sections of the work focus on Muhammad’s legacy, his final pilgrimage, and his passing, ending with reflections on the impact of his teachings. The cantos are composed in the Tamil poetic form of viruttam, integrating both narrative and lyrical elements to convey religious devotion and ethical guidance.

== Cultural and religious significance ==
Seera Puranam holds a unique place within Tamil Muslim communities and has served as a medium for religious education. The text is recited in mosques and during religious gatherings, especially on occasions like the Prophet’s birthday (Mawlid). It is also used as a teaching text in some madrassas in Tamil Nadu to convey Islamic principles through Tamil language and poetry.

== Legacy and influence ==
The influence of Seera Puranam extends beyond Tamil Muslims, as it is recognized within Tamil literary circles as a classical work that contributes to the diversity of the Tamil literary tradition. The epic has inspired later Tamil Muslim poets and writers who followed Umaru Pulavar’s approach of adapting Islamic stories for Tamil-speaking audiences. In modern times, cultural organizations and the Tamil Nadu government have promoted Seera Puranam through literary festivals, reprints, and translations, preserving its legacy for future generations.

== See also ==
- Tamil literature
- Umaru Pulavar
- Islamic literature
