= Ettayapuram =

- town
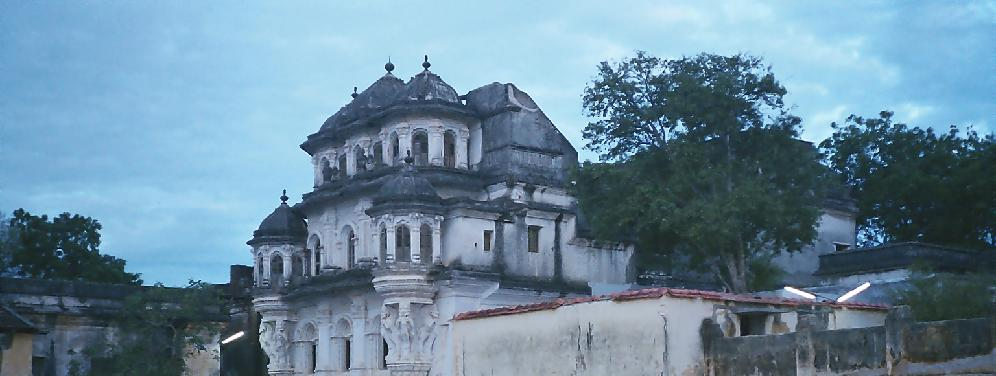
- Ettappan's palace

- Location within Tamil Nadu
- Coordinates: 9.1500°N 77.9833°E
- Country: India
- State: Tamil Nadu
- District: Thoothukudi

Government
  - Chairperson of Town Panchayat: K. Govindha Raja Perumal
- Elevation: 60 m (200 ft)

Population (2001)
  - Total: 12,800

Languages
  - Official: Tamil
- Time zone: UTC+5:30 (IST)
- PIN: 628902
- Telephone code: 04632
- Vehicle registration: TN 69 Z
- Sex ratio: 52:48 ♂/♀

Ettayapuram is a panchayat town in Thoothukudi district of Tamil Nadu, India. It is the birthplace of Tamil poets Mahakavi Bharathiar and Umaru Pulavar. Muthuswami Dikshitar, one of the triads of Carnatic music, was patronized in his final years by the ruler of Ettayapuram.

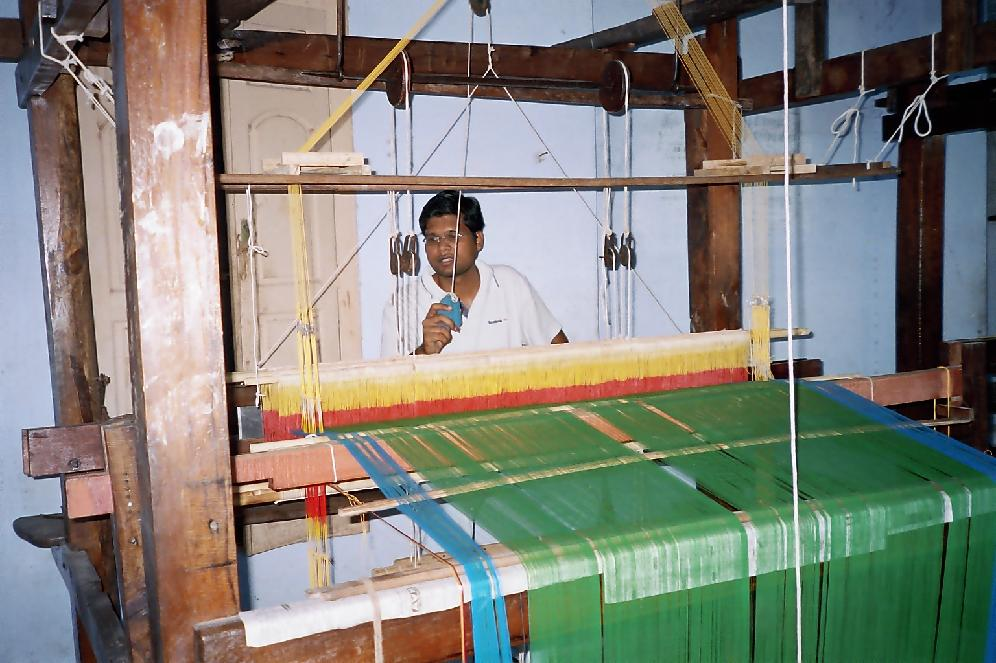
Sengunthar Weaver with a handloom in Ettayapuram

== History ==
Ettayapuram was originally Ilasanadu, which was ruled by the Pandya Kings. After the Pandyas, Ettappan was appointed as palayakarar by Madurai Nayak dynasty under the supervision of Vijayanagara Empire. After 150 years of rule by the descendants of Ettappan, Ilasanadu became Ettayapuram in 1565.

=== Ettayapuram estate ===
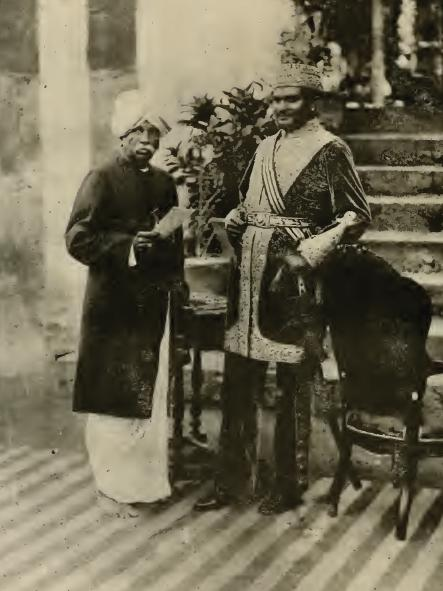
Raja Jagavira Rama Kumara Ettappa Nayaker Aiyan of Ettaiyapuram with his Diwan Ranganadha Chettiar

Ettaiyapuram estate was a zamindari estate situated in the Ettayapuram taluk of the erstwhile Tuticorin district. The estate covered an area of 570 square miles (1,500 km^{2}) and 374 villages and in 1901, had a population of 154,000. The headquarters of the estate was the town of Ettaiyapuram.

The estate was ruled by the Telugu Nayak dynasty whose ancestors hailed from Chandragiri in present-day Andhra Pradesh. During an invasion of Alauddin Khalji, Kumaramuttu Nayak the founder of the dynasty migrated from Chandragiri to Tirunelveli where he was granted the region comprising the later-established Ettaiyapuram estate. The town of Ettaiyapuram was established in 1567.

== Civic administration ==
Ettayapuram is a town panchayat that is part of the Thoothukudi district, which was carved out of the erstwhile Tirunelveli district. It was in Kovilpatti constituency till 2006 general Elections and Now it comes under the Vilathikulam constituency of Tamil Nadu legislative assembly from 2011 Elections.

== Demographics ==
As of 2001 India census, Ettayapuram had a population of 12,800. Males constitute 48% of the population and females 52%. Ettayapuram has an average literacy rate of 69%, higher than the national average of 59.5%: male literacy is 78%, and female literacy is 61%. In Ettayapuram, 10% of the population is under 6 years of age.

== Economy ==
People of Ettayapuram are primarily engaged in weaving, making matches and agriculture. Traditional weavers weave cotton yarn using handlooms. Small companies operate power looms and allied trades of preparing the thread for weaving and dyeing. The other major industry is the manufacture of match boxes, which includes manufacturing small boxes that contain matchsticks, preparing match sticks and loading them on to the matchboxes. The area of land under cultivation has fallen due to failing rains and relatively poor soil fertility. The soil type is black soil, which supports crops like kezhvaragu, cumbu, cholam, cotton and sunflower. The Kanni breed of goats, a drought-resistant variety reared for its meat, is most common in this region.

== Transport ==
Ettayapuram is connected to Madurai, Thoothukkudi, Ramanathapuram, Rameshwaram, Tirunelveli, Kovilpatti, Sattur, Virudhunagar, Sivakasi, Sankarankovil, Aruppukottai, Vilathikulam by road. The nearest railway station is Kovilpatti, which is 15 km from Ettayapuram. The nearest airport is Thoothukudi Airport, which is 62 km from Ettayapuram.

== Landmarks ==
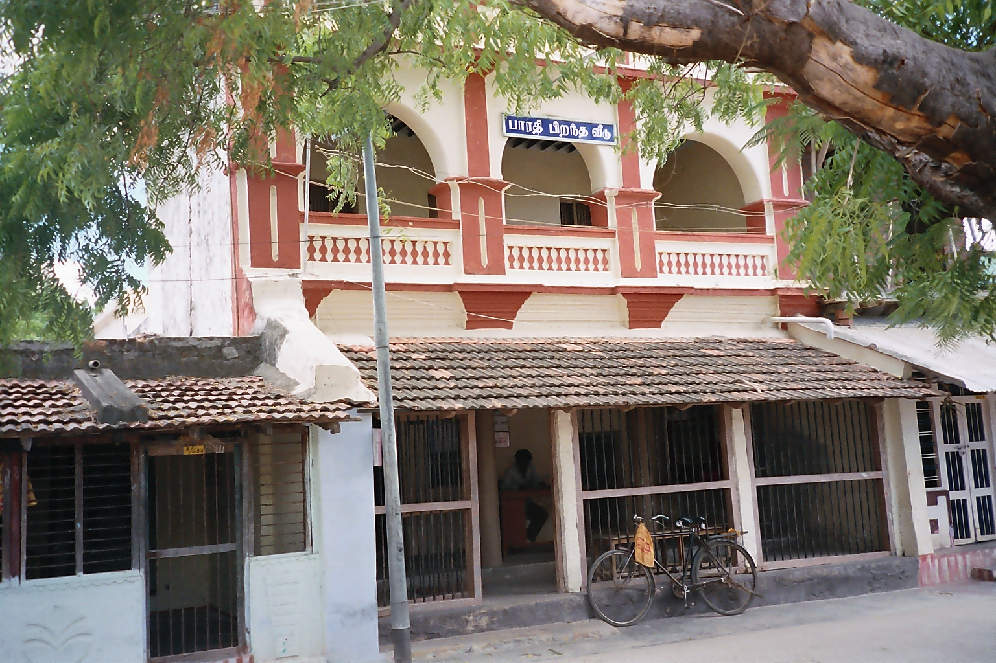
The house in Ettayapuram where Bharathiar was born

- Bharathiar's House
- Bharathy's Memorial
- Muthuswamy Dikshitar's Memorial
- Umaru Pulavar Dargah
- Ettappan's Palace
- Sri Suppusamy Samathi
- The Great Pandyan Pond
- Jemini & Savithri drinking Water Tank

== Notable people ==
Subramanya Bharathy, better known as Mahakavi Bharathiar was born here on 11 December 1882. A prolific writer, philosopher and visionary, Bharathiar was also one of the most prominent leaders of the Indian independence movement in South India.

Ettappan, after whom the place was named carried a negative impression as he gave away the information regarding “Veerapandiya” Kattabomman Nayak's whereabouts to the British, which eventually led to his arrest and hanging. Ettappan became a metaphor for a traitor. His namesake descendants were involved in welfare activities including arrangements for water supply through huge tanks and patronized poets and musicians including Bharathy and Muthuswami Dikshitar.

Umaru Pulavar (Tamil: உமறுப் புலவர்) was a Tamil Muslim poet from Tamil Nadu, India. Umaru Pulavar was born in 1642 in the town of Ettayapuram in Thoothukudi district. He is celebrated as one of the greatest Islamic Poets of India.

== See also ==
- Kadalaiyur
- kovilpatti
