= TMMK =

TMMK can refer to:

- T-Mobile Macedonia – Former name of Makedonski Telekom, a wireless operator in North Macedonia
- Tamil Nadu Muslim Munnetra Kazagham - A non-governmental organisation based in Tamil Nadu
- Toyota Motor Manufacturing Kentucky - A Toyota operation in Kentucky
