= P. Jainulabdeen =

Tamil Islamic scholar

P. Jainulabideen
- Born: 10 February 1953 (age 73); Thondi-Ramanathapuram District, Tamil Nadu
- Other name: PJ
- Years active: 1995 - now
- Notable work: translated Quran to Tamil

P. Jainulabideen, also known as PJ is an Islamic scholar, teacher and preacher, primarily in the Tamil language and also co-founder of Tamil Nadu Muslim Munnetra Kazagham in 1995. After the political stand of Tamil Nadu Muslim Munnetra Kazhagam he walked out from TMMK and started an Islamic non-profit organization, Tamil Nadu Thowheed Jamath. He is one of the Pioneers in the region who advocated that Quran and Sunnah (Authentic Hadith) as the sole sources of religious authority and oppose everything introduced in Islam after the earliest times. He has been extremely vocal against Terrorism and Dowry among Islamic Community in Tamil Nadu south India.

In May 2018 he was expelled from TNTJ
