= Algernon Brown (judge) =

British colonial judge (1900–1960)

Sir Algernon Brown KC
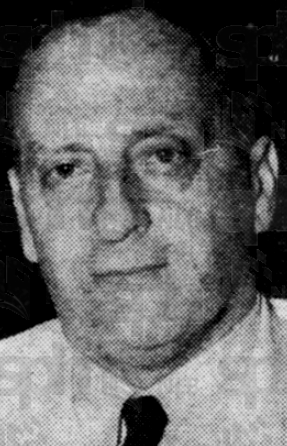
- Brown in 1951

Chief Justice of Northern Nigeria
- In office 1955–1960

Solicitor-General of Kenya
- In office 1940–1946

Personal details
- Born: 22 May 1900
- Died: 5 October 1960 (aged 60)
- Children: 3
- Education: Oriel College, Oxford
- Profession: Barrister and colonial judge

Sir Thomas Algernon Brown (22 May 1900 – 5 October 1960) was a British barrister and colonial judge.

== Early life and education ==
Brown was born on 22 May 1900, the son of James Algernon Brown. He was educated at Marlborough College and, after two years' military service in India, went up to Oriel College, Oxford in 1922.

Brown was commissioned into the 16th Cavalry of the Indian Army in 1920, saw active service in the North-West Frontier region as part of the Waziristan Field Force, and was mentioned in despatches.

== Career ==
Brown was called to the Bar by the Inner Temple in 1926, and practised for seven years on the Midland Circuit. In 1933, he went to the Gold Coast as Crown Counsel. In 1939, he was attached to the legal staff of the Colonial Office, and in the following year transferred to Kenya where he served as Solicitor-General and a member of the Legislative Council of the Colony.

In 1946, he was appointed a puisne judge in Singapore, a position he held until 1955, and on occasion acted as Attorney-General of the Federation of Malaya, and Chief Justice of Singapore. His most famous case was that involving Maria Hertogh which received worldwide attention when his verdict led to rioting and the death of 18 people. A custody battle between a Dutch couple, Maria's biological parents, and a Malay-Muslim foster mother, Brown ruled that, "the 13-year-old girl should be returned to the custody of her father and that her marriage to the Malay school teacher Inche Mansoor Adabi was invalid". His decision was subsequently upheld by the Singapore Court of Appeal.

In 1955, Brown was appointed Chief Justice of Northern Nigeria. He a played a key role in the legal and judicial reform in northern Nigeria for which he was knighted in 1956. He died while in office in 1960.

== Personal life and death ==
Brown married Mary Wynne-Savory in 1941, and they had two sons and a daughter.

Brown died on 5 October 1960, aged 60.

== Honours ==
Brown was appointed Knight Bachelor in the 1956 Birthday Honours.
