= Kadalaiyur =

- Panchayat Village
- Location within Tamil Nadu
- Coordinates: 9.2015099287339°N 77.94461803873934°E,
- Country: India
- State: Tamil Nadu
- District: Thoothukudi

Area
  - Total: 9.0962 km^{2} (3.5121 sq mi)

Population (2011)
  - Total: 3,857 (approx)
  - Density: 424.0/km^{2} (1,098/sq mi)

Languages
  - Official: Tamil
- Time zone: UTC+5:30 (IST)
- PIN: 628902
- Telephone code: 04632 245333
- Vehicle registration: TN 96

Kadalaiyur is a rural village located in the Ettayapuram taluka of the Thoothukkudi district in the state of Tamil Nadu, India. It is situated 10 km away from sub-district headquarter Ettayapuram and 55 km away from district headquarter Thoothukkudi. As per 2009 stats, Kadalaiyur village is also a gram panchayat. The location code of the village is 642260.

Kadalaiyur has a total geographical area of 909.62 hectares.

== Demographics ==
Based on the 2011 census info, Kadalaiyur has a total population of 3,857 people living in approximately 1,139 households. The male to female ratio is approximately 1:1.

Approximately 1,977 individuals within the total population are workers. Approximately 403 are children aged 0–6 years.

== Transportation ==
Kadalaiyur has access to both public and private bus services. Additionally, there is a railway station located 5–10 km from the village.

== Education ==
The literacy rate of Kadalaiyur village is approximately 80.49%. This is slightly higher than Tamil Nadu's overall average of 80.09%. The literacy rate for males is approximately 88.40% while the literacy rate for females is slightly lower at about 72.60%.

=== Nearby Colleges and Universities ===
- Tamil Nadu Agricultural University, Black Soil Farm
- Punitha Ohm College of Education
- Lakshmi Ammal Polytechnic College
- KR College of Arts & Science
- Unnamalal Institute of Technology
- G.Venkataswamy Naidu College
- SDM Arts & Science College

=== Nearby Schools ===
- Sengunthar High School, kadalaiyur
- TDTA Middle School
