= Maria Hertogh =

Subject of 1950 civil unrest in Singapore

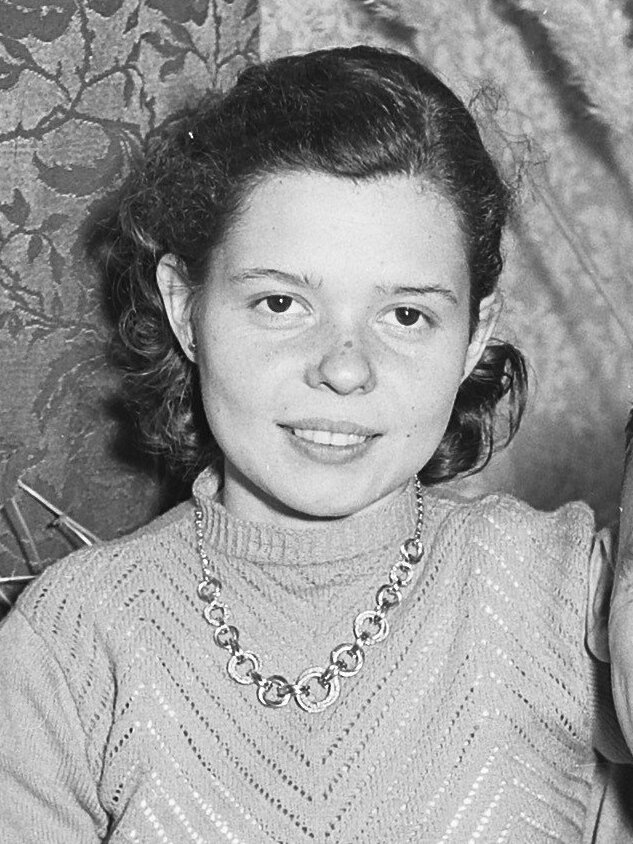
- Maria in 1955
- Born: Huberdina Maria Hertogh; 24 March 1937; Tjimahi, West Java, Dutch East Indies (now Indonesia)
- Died: 8 July 2009 (aged 72); Huijbergen, Netherlands
- Other names: Bertha Hertogh; Nadra Adabi; Nadra binte Ma'arof; Natrah
- Citizenship: Dutch
- Known for: Being at the centre of the Maria Hertogh riots
- Spouses: Mansoor Adabi (m. 1950; ann. 1950); Johan Gerardus Wolkefeld (m. 1956; div. 1976); Antonius Christianus Ballermans (m. 1979; div. 1983); Benjamin Leopold Pichel (m. 1984; div. 2004)
- Children: 7
- Parent(s): Adeline Hunter (natal mother); Adrianus Petrus Hertogh (natal father); Che Aminah (adoptive mother)

Maria Huberdina Hertogh (born Huberdina Maria Hertogh; 24 March 1937 – 8 July 2009), also known as Bertha Hertogh, Nadra binte Ma'arof, Nadra Adabi or simply Natrah, was a Dutch woman of Eurasian descent and Malay upbringing. She is notable for being at the centre of the Maria Hertogh riots when she was a young girl.

She was born to Dutch Roman Catholic parents in Java (then part of the Dutch East Indies). During World War II, her parents were imprisoned by the Japanese and she was given to a Malay Muslim, Che Aminah binte Mohamed, and raised as a Muslim under the name Nadra. After the war, Maria’s biological parents sought to reclaim her and a custody battle ensued between the Hertoghs and Che Aminah.

The British colonial court in Singapore ruled in favor of the Dutch parents in 1950, ordering that Maria be returned to them. The court's decision was seen as an insult to Islam, since Maria was taken from a Muslim home and forced to leave her faith. A protest by outraged Muslims escalated when images of her were published showing her kneeling before a statue of the Virgin Mary and Saint Blaise, leading to riots that took place between 11 and 13 December 1950 in Singapore. 18 people were killed and 173 injured; many properties were also damaged.

== Birth and baptism ==
Huberdina Maria Hertogh was born on 24 March 1937 to a Dutch Catholic family living in Cimahi, near Bandung, Java, then a part of the Dutch East Indies (now Indonesia).

Her biological father, Adrianus Petrus Hertogh, came to Java in the 1920s as a sergeant in the Royal Netherlands East Indies Army. In the early 1930s, he married Adeline Hunter, a Eurasian of Scottish-Javanese descent brought up in Java. Maria was baptised in the Roman Catholic Church of Saint Ignatius at Tjimahi on 10 April 1937 by a Catholic priest.

== Early life ==
At the outbreak of World War II, Adrianus Hertogh, a sergeant in the Dutch Army, was captured by the Imperial Japanese Army and sent to a POW camp in Japan, where he was kept until 1945. Meanwhile, Adeline Hertogh stayed with her mother, Nor Louise, and her five children, among whom Maria was the third and youngest daughter. On 29 December 1942, Adeline gave birth to her sixth child, a boy. Three days later, Maria went to stay with Che Aminah binte Mohammad, a 42-year-old Malay woman from Kemaman, Terengganu, Malaya (now Malaysia) who was a close friend of Nor Louise.

=== Adeline Hertogh's version of events ===
According to Adeline Hertogh, in testimony given in evidence before the court at the hearing in November 1950, she was persuaded by her mother after the birth of her sixth child to allow Maria to go and stay with Aminah in Bandung for three or four days. Consequently, Aminah arrived on 1 January 1943 to fetch Maria. When the child was not returned, Hertogh borrowed a bicycle on 6 January and set out to retrieve her. She claimed that she was stopped by a Japanese sentry on the outskirts of Bandung as she did not possess a pass and was therefore interned.

From her internment camp, she smuggled a letter to her mother, requesting for her children to be sent to her. This Nor Louise did, but Maria was not among them. Hertogh asked her mother to fetch Maria from Aminah. Her mother later wrote and told her that Aminah wanted to keep Maria for two more days, after which she herself would bring the child to the camp. However, Hertogh did not see Maria throughout her internment. After her release, she could not find either Maria nor Aminah.

=== Life with Aminah ===
Upon arriving with Aminah, Maria was given the name Nadra binte Ma'arof. For unknown reasons, her new family moved to Jakarta for a period before moving back to Bandung, where Aminah worked for the Japanese military police as an interpreter until the end of the war.

Aminah moved back to her hometown of Kampung Banggol in Kemaman, Terengganu. By then Maria was the same as any other Malay Muslim girl of her age: she spoke only Malay, wore Malay clothes, and practiced her religion devoutly.

Maria had an adoptive elder sister of Japanese descent, Kamariah Mohd Dahan, whom Aminah had adopted in Tokyo when she lived there with her husband.

=== Custody battle ===
In 1945, with the end of World War II, Sergeant Hertogh was released and returned to Java and reunited with his wife. The couple stated that they inquired about Maria, but could find neither her nor Aminah. They returned to the Netherlands after requesting the Dutch authorities in Java and Singapore to search for the child. Investigations were then made by the Red Cross Society, the Royal Netherlands Army, the Indonesian Repatriation Service, and local police. Finally, in September 1949, Aminah and Maria were traced to the kampung in which they were living.

Negotiations were opened to retrieve Maria in early 1950. The Dutch Consulate offered $500 to make up for Aminah's expenses in bringing up the girl for eight years. Aminah rejected the offer. Attempts were then made to persuade Aminah to travel with Maria to Singapore in April to discuss the issue with the Dutch Consul-General; Aminah again refused. The Consulate then applied to the High Court of Singapore on 22 April for Maria to be delivered into the custody of the Social Welfare Department, pending further order. The Chief Justice heard the request the same day and approved the application ex parte. The next day, an officer from the department served the order to take Maria from Aminah's custody, and Maria was then placed in the Girls' Home at York Hill.

From this point on, Maria made it clear that she wanted to stay with Aminah and did not wish to be returned to her natal parents. Aminah contended that Adeline had given Maria over to her willingly, and this was supported by the testimony of Soewaldi Hunter, Adeline's elder brother, who bore witness to the adoption. However, after a 15-minute hearing on 19 May, the High Court ruled that the custody of Maria be granted to the Hertoghs.

As Aminah and Maria exited the court via the back door, a car from the consulate was waiting to take Maria away. Maria refused to enter the car and clung on to Aminah, both shouting in Malay that they would kill themselves rather than be separated. A large crowd quickly formed around the commotion. It was only after much persuasion that Aminah agreed to enter the car together with Maria and pay a visit to her lawyer, who explained that Maria had to be given up until an appeal was made. The duo then parted in tears, with Maria returned to the convent for temporary safekeeping.

Maria stayed at the convent for two more months under a further order from the Chief Justice pending appeal, which was filed on 28 July. The verdict was an overruling of the earlier decision; aside from the ex parte order to hand Maria to the Social Welfare Department, the Appellate Court found ambiguity in the Dutch Consul-General's representation of Maria's natal father. Both Aminah and Maria were overjoyed.

=== Controversial marriage ===
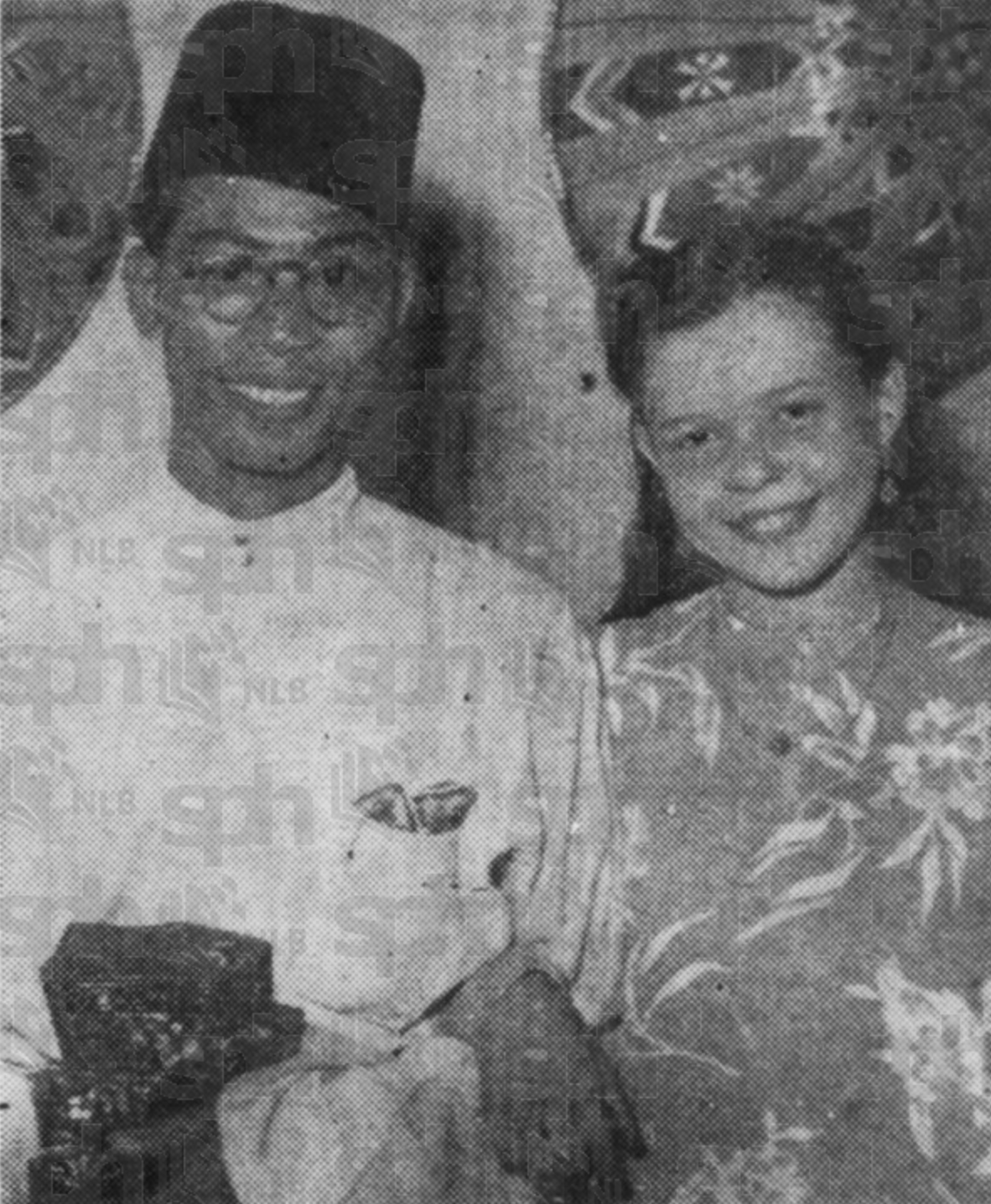
Maria with Mansoor Adabi in 1950

On 1 August 1950, 13-year-old Maria was married by way of a nikah gantung (to be consummated when both parties were of age, valid under Islamic law) to 21-year-old Mansoor Adabi, a Kelantan-born teacher-in-training at the Bukit Panjang Government School. The marriage was later speculated to have been a manoeuvre by Aminah to prevent further retrieval attempts by the Hertoghs; Maria returned to live with Aminah after the wedding night, and the marriage was never consummated. Because the marriage had been solemnised in Singapore, which was at that time under British rule, British law controlled the validity of the marriage rather than Malayan law.

The first challenges on the marriage's validity came from within the Muslim community. On 10 August, a Muslim leader wrote to The Straits Times, pointing out that although Islamic law permits the marriage of girls starting after puberty (which Maria had reached a year earlier), there were Muslim countries such as Egypt that legislated for a minimum marriage age of 16. He added, however, that it would not be in the interest of "the friendly understanding... between Christians and Muslims" to object to the marriage since it had already taken place. The latter view was held by the majority of the Muslim population, albeit in a more antagonistic mood against the Dutch and Europeans at large.

=== Second appeal ===
Meanwhile, the Hertoghs had not given up legal pursuit to retrieve Maria. Only a day after the marriage, Aminah received the Hertoghs' representative lawyers from Kuala Lumpur. The lawyers delivered a letter demanding Maria's return by 10 August, failing which legal action would be taken. Believing that the marriage settled the matter, Aminah and Mansoor both ignored the deadline. The Hertoghs did not. On 26 August, an originating summons was taken out, under the Guardianship of Infants Ordinance, by the Hertoghs as plaintiffs against Aminah, Maria and Mansoor, who were all made defendants.

The hearing proceeded between 20 and 24 November. For four months, the matter hung in suspense. During this time, in order to avoid public scrutiny, Maria rarely left her residence in the house of M.A. Majid, then-president of the Muslim Welfare Association and Adabi's foster father. Nevertheless, media coverage on the incident had grown to a global scale. Letters from Muslim organisations in Pakistan promising financial and other help arrived, some going so far as to declare any further move by the Dutch Government to separate the couple as "an open challenge to the Muslim world". Pledges of aid also came from Maria's native Indonesia and as far as Saudi Arabia.

The hearing finally opened, and Maria's natal mother, Adeline Hertogh travelled down to Singapore to attend. The judge, Justice Algernon Brown, delivered the verdict in the case entitled Re M. H. Hertogh, an Infant: Hertogh v. Amina binte Mohamed and Others two weeks later. The marriage, instead of resolving the dispute, had instead complicated it. His judgment stated inter alia:

1. That "after a most careful consideration of all the evidence which bears upon this marriage, the age of the child, the opportunities which she had of knowing Mansoor, and the date of the marriage in relation to the date of the Court of Appeal decision, I am compelled to the conclusion that this purported marriage was a manoeuvre designed to prejudice these proceedings, which is discreditable to all concerned. In saying that, I wish to make it clear that I am satisfied that the child was neither forced nor tricked into it."
2. That "following the rule in Sottomayor v. De Barros (No. 2), the validity of a marriage celebrated in Singapore between persons of whom the one has a Singapore, and the other a foreign, domicile is not affected by any incapacity which, though existing under the law of such foreign domicile, does not exist under the law of Singapore."
3. That nevertheless "Maria's incapacity [to contract marriage] under the law of her (father's domicile), admittedly Holland, to contract the marriage, since she was under age, existed also under the law of Singapore."
4. That "since her father had not waived or by his conduct abrogated his legal right to control the religion of his child and had not consented to her becoming a Muslim, whatever the child may say and whatever ceremonies and teaching she may have undergone, she is not in the eyes of this court a Muslim."
5. That "therefore the purported marriage was void."

Having over-ruled the purported marriage, Justice Brown went on to deal with what he described as the "most difficult" question of custody. He noted that his duty to the law required him "to have regard primarily to the welfare of the infant". He believed this meant that he not only had to consider the current wishes of Maria, but also her future well-being. He stated:

"It is natural that she should now wish to remain in Malaya among people whom she knows. But who can say that she will have the same views some years hence after her outlooks has been enlarged, and her contacts extended, in the life of the family to which she belongs?"

He also noted that whatever the details of the contested initiation of the custody at the end of 1942 might be, Adrianus Hertogh had not been part of it and had not abrogated his parental rights. He therefore awarded the custody of Maria to the Hertoghs and ordered that she should be handed over to her mother with immediate effect.

=== Stay at the convent ===
When police came to take Maria, she wept and clung to Aminah and Mansoor. Aminah fainted on the spot and a doctor standing by had to attend to her. Mansoor advised Maria to concede for the time being and promised that he and others would carry on the legal fight. Thus Maria allowed herself to be brought away into a car. Outside, the police, including a Gurkha Contingent, held back a crowd of several hundred.

The car delivered Maria to the Roman Catholic Convent of the Good Shepherd, run by the Sisters of the Good Shepherd, at Thomson Road. Mrs. Hertogh stayed at another address for a few days, from where she visited Maria daily, before moving into the convent herself. According to an official of the Netherlands Consulate-General, such arrangement was because of "greater convenience" while the stay of execution pending appeal was in effect. But it proved to be the spark that lit the fuse of the subsequent riots.

The press was not barred from entering the convent grounds. On 5 December, the Singapore Tiger Standard published on its front page a photograph of Maria standing holding hands with the Reverend Mother. There were several more pictures on page 2, under the headline: Bertha knelt before [the] Virgin Mary Statue. The Malay press retorted. The Utusan Melayu published on 7 December three photographs of Maria weeping and being comforted by a nun, as well as articles about Maria's "lonely and miserable" life in the convent.

These pictures, whether presenting Maria as happy or sad, mostly showed Maria surrounded by symbols of Christian faith. The Muslims, who looked upon Maria as one of their own, were deeply offended by such pictures, not to mention the sensational reports, some of which explicitly labelled the case as a religious issue between Islam and Christianity.

On 9 December, an organisation calling itself the Nadra Action Committee was formally constituted under the leadership of Karim Ghani, a Muslim political activist from Rangoon. The Committee solicited support among local Muslims by distributing free copies of its newspaper, the Dawn (not the Dawn, an English paper published in Pakistan). Karim Ghani had also made an open speech at the Sultan Mosque on 8 December in which he mentioned jihad as a final resort.

In the light of the mounting backlash, the Criminal Investigation Department sent a memo to the Colonial Secretary suggesting moving Maria back to York Hill to avoid further inciting Muslim anger. The Secretary did not agree on grounds that he had received no such representations from Muslim leaders, nor did he have the authority to remove Maria without further court orders. It cannot be said definitively that moving Maria out of the convent at such a late stage could have averted the riots.

== The riots and subsequent trials ==
Crowds were enraged by the Court's rejection of the appeal.

The appeal hearing opened on 11 December. Maria stayed at the convent and did not attend. Since early morning, crowds carrying banners and flags with star and crescent symbols began to gather around the Supreme Court. By noon, when the hearing eventually began, the restive crowd had grown from 2,000 to 3,000 in number. The court threw out the appeal within five minutes. The brevity of the hearing convinced the gathering that the colonial legal system was biased against Muslims. The riots erupted.

The riots continued for three days and a curfew was imposed for two weeks. The mob, largely consisting of Muslims, moved out to attack any Europeans and even Eurasians in sight. They overturned cars and burnt them. The police force and its lower ranks largely consisted of Malays who sympathized with the rioters' cause and were ineffective in quelling the riots. By nightfall, the riots had spread to even the more remote parts of the island. Help from the British military was enlisted only at around 6:45 PM. Major-General Dunlop promptly deployed two internal security battalions while calling in further reinforcements from Malaya. Meanwhile, various Muslim leaders appealed over the radio for the riots to cease.

Reinforcements arrived early on 12 December, but riotous incidents continued on that day. The troops and police only managed to regain control of the situation by noon on 13 December. In total, 18 people were killed, among whom were seven Europeans or Eurasians, two police officers, and nine rioters shot by the police or military, 173 were injured, many of them seriously, 119 vehicles were damaged and at least two buildings were set on fire. Subsequently, two weeks of 24-hour curfew were imposed, and it was a long time before complete law and order were re-established.

The first procession to be arranged would be this – 1500 girls aged 14 and under would march in procession to the Convent to present a Quran, a praying carpet, and two Malay dresses to Maria. One of the many complaints is the rumor that the Quran, the praying carpet, and the Malay dresses sent by Aminah did not reach Maria.

— The words of Karim Ghani at the congregation to adopt four remedies to calm the tense situation, quoted in, Haja Maideen, The Nadra Tragedy: the Maria Hertogh Controversy, p. 220.

After the riot, the police set up a special investigation unit that detained 778 people, among them Karim Ghani. Out of these, 403 were released unconditionally and 106 were released on various conditions (they generally had to report to the police station monthly and adhere to a curfew after dark). The police eventually brought rioting charges against 200 people, of whom 25 were acquitted, 100 were convicted, 62 were referred to the Enquiry Advisory Committee and seven were brought to trial at the Assize Court for wanton killing and five of them were subsequently sentenced to death on the gallows. One of the five that was sentenced to the gallows was A.K.S. Othman Ghani, a respected Indian businessman from Madras.

On 25 August 1951, Tunku Abdul Rahman, who would later become the first Prime Minister of Malaysia, took over as the president of UMNO, a Malay-centric party. He immediately set out to save the five on death row. Having garnered support from the Muslim population, Abdul Rahman placed pressure on the authorities, who finally gave in. The British government was expecting their role as the colonial master to end very soon and did not wish to leave behind grim memories. The death sentences for all five were commuted to life imprisonment.

== Aftermath of the riots ==
A Commission of Inquiry was appointed by Governor Franklin Gimson. It was headed by Sir Lionel Leach, a member of the Judicial Committee of the Privy Council. The Commission placed large blame on the police command for not having anticipated the violence from many indicators between 2 and 11 December. Furthermore, when the riots first started, the police failed to act promptly to disperse the crowd. The Gurkha Contingent standing by was not put into action, while too much dependence was placed on Malay policemen, many of whom defected or at least hesitated to carry out their duties. The British House of Commons criticised the colonial government for its poor handling of the situation.

The present-day Government of Singapore under then-Prime Minister Lee Kuan Yew also attributes the tragedy to the insensitivity of the colonial government towards the racial and religious feelings of the locals. It cites the incident as a vital lesson learnt in the importance of racial and religious understanding and harmony, as well as a case for imposing a certain degree of government control on the media, especially when racial or religious issues are implicated.

== Leaving for the Netherlands ==
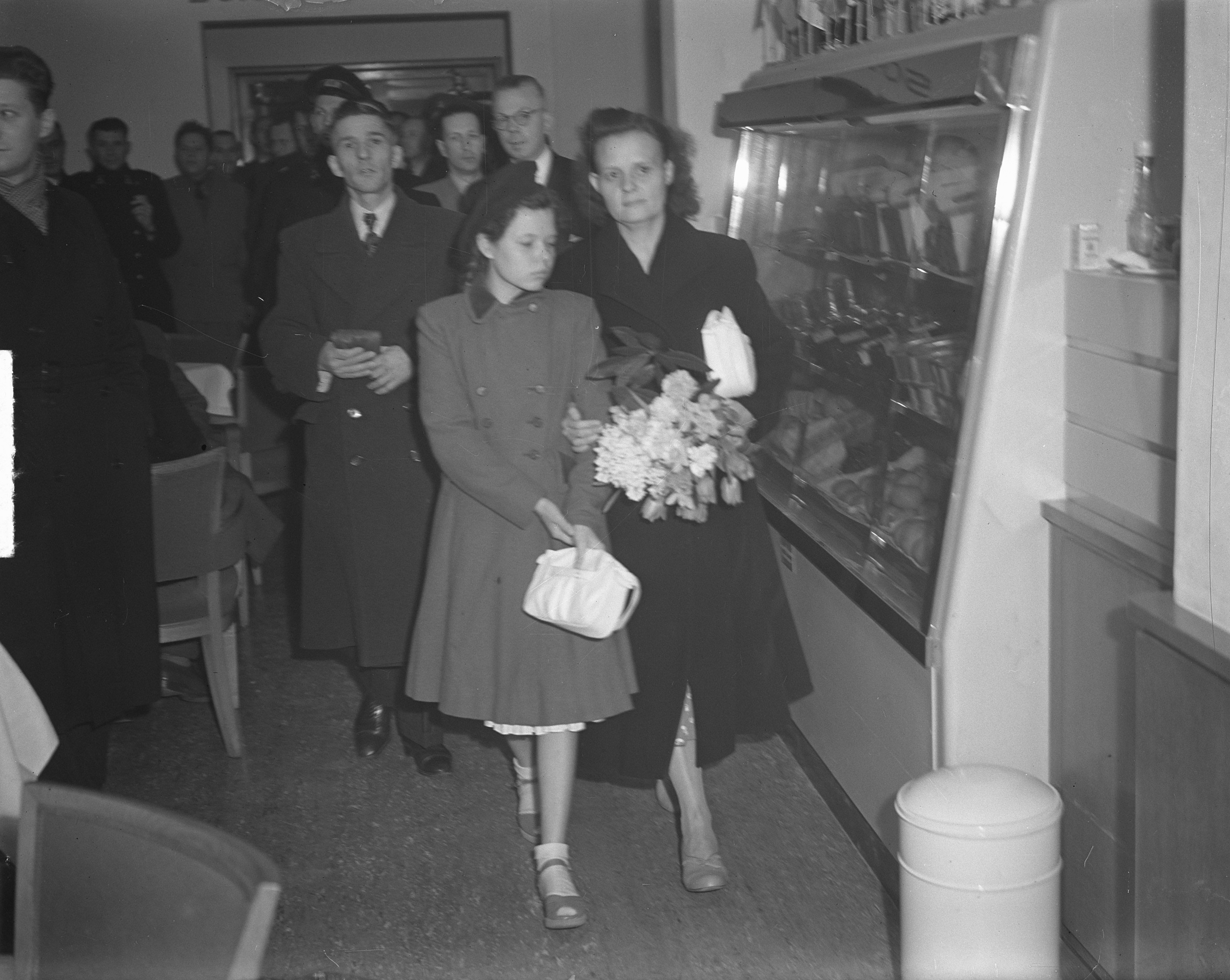
Maria with her mother after their arrival at Schiphol Airport

On the night the riots broke out, Maria was moved out of the convent, where the rioters tried twice to march on and were only kept back by the police. Plans were made at York Hill to receive her but she was instead sent to Saint John's Island, an offshore island 4 miles south of the main island of Singapore. The next day, Maria was taken by Adeline to the Netherlands by aeroplane. After landing in Schiphol Airport, they quickly proceeded to the Hertogh home on the outskirts of Bergen op Zoom.

At first, Maria could only talk to Adeline, the only one in the family who understood Malay. She demanded rice with every meal, resenting the western diet, and continued to perform her Muslim prayers five times a day. In addition, a policeman in plain clothes was assigned to escort her whenever she left the house, for fear of possible kidnappers who might take her back to Singapore, following reported sighting of "oriental strangers" around town. The house was also placed under surveillance.

Slowly, Maria began to adjust to her new environment. A nun came to the house daily to teach her Dutch until she was proficient enough to attend a local convent school. She also began to attend Mass with her family. Back in Singapore, Aminah and Mansoor had apparently given up hope of retrieving Maria after leave to appeal to the Judicial Committee of the Privy Council was not granted. Earlier interest of the several Muslim groups involved had also gradually died down.

== Second and third marriages ==
On 20 April 1956, Maria married Johan Gerardus "Joep" Wolkenfelt, a 21-year-old Dutch Catholic. On 15 February 1957, she gave birth to a son, the first of ten children. However, Maria did not seem to be contented. As she told De Telegraaf, she often had rows with Adeline, who lived nearby. She also said she still longed for her Malayan homeland. Johan and Mansoor began corresponding via letters. Both expressed a wish for Maria to travel to Malaya to visit the aged Aminah, but such a trip was never made due primarily to financial difficulties. Aminah died in 1976 and Mansoor would die of a heart attack in 1988.

On 16 August 1976, Maria found herself on trial in a Dutch court charged with plotting to murder her husband. She admitted in court that she had been thinking about leaving her husband but was afraid to start divorce proceedings in case she lost custody of her children. She came into contact with two regular customers at her husband's café bar. The trio bought a revolver and recruited a fourth accomplice to carry out the actual murder. However, the last member got cold feet and gossiped about the murder plan. The police quickly learnt of it and arrested all four conspirators.

At her trial, Maria was quoted as saying: "I was a slave in my own home. I lived in a prison. I was not allowed to do anything. Joep [Johan] kicked up a row even if I went to drink a coffee somewhere."

In her defence, Maria's lawyers brought up her background, which the court acknowledged. With this in mind, and because the plot was never executed and there was no proof that she offered any inducement to the other three, the three-man bench acquitted Maria. Meanwhile, Maria had also filed for divorce on the grounds of the irreparable breakdown of her marriage. Several days before Christmas 1979, Maria married, for the third time, one of her co-conspirators, Antonius Christianus "Tom" Ballermans. Their domestic life was happy at first; however, three years into the marriage, Ballermans' behaviour became troublesome and worrying. He'd started drinking in excess. Suspicious, Maria followed him to a cafeteria, where she discovered he was having an affair. They would divorce in 1983.

== Fourth marriage and moving to the US ==
After her divorce from Ballermans, Maria moved to Zuidsingel, a neighbourhood in Bergen op Zoom. There, she reconnected with an old friend who offered her employment at her Indonesian food stall at a night market. In early 1984, she was admitted to hospital due to a stroke resulting from blocked arteries. After being kept for a week, she was discharged and returned to her job at the stall.

It was at this stall that Maria met Benjamin Leopold Pichel, a naturalised Dutch citizen of Indonesian descent. Pichel was originally from Jakarta, Indonesia and a sailor by profession. That same year, they married and on 15 September 1984, emigrated to the United States, intent on opening an Indonesian restaurant there. They elected to settle in Lake Tahoe, Nevada. Lacking employment authorisation from the Immigration and Naturalization Service, Maria could only work ill-paid odd jobs such as a babysitter or a chambermaid.

In March 1989, Malaysian journalist Fatini Yaacob, along with two of Maria's children, flew to Lake Tahoe to interview her for the Dewan Masyarakat. Yaacob informed her that the Terengganu State Government, under the leadership of Tan Sri Wan Mokhtar Ahmad, had offered her a parcel of land in Kemaman District if she wished to return to Malaysia. Maria declined, citing her trauma from the riots and fearing her safety.

However, on 29 January 1998, Maria did return to Kemaman for Hari Raya (the local name for the Muslim Eid al-Fitr festival) and reunited with Kamariah, as well as paying her respects to Che Aminah's grave. It was their first meeting in 48 years; unfortunately, it would be the only time they were able to see each other again before Kamariah died of leukemia. Sometime between 2001 and 2003, Maria left Pichel and returned to the Netherlands, settling in Huijbergen. The two officially divorced in 2004.

== Death ==
On 8 July 2009, Maria died of leukemia at her house in Huijbergen at the age of 72. She donated her body to scientific research.

In 2014, Singaporean channel Channel NewsAsia, in cooperation with Monsoon Pictures, broadcast a five-part documentary about the tumultuous era of the 1950s and 1960s in Singapore called Days of Rage. In part, it featured the Maria Hertogh riots, including exclusive interviews with Maria herself and Kamariah prior to their deaths. Maria's son and two daughters spoke about witnessing their mother's frosty relationship with Adeline, and her struggle to come to terms with her painful childhood. Her son testified that she was not happy and felt betrayed. The siblings also paid a visit to Kemaman and met several elderly kampung residents who remembered the young Maria, then known to them as Nadra. In an interview sometime before her death, which was featured in Days of Rage, Maria had once said she despised her natal mother for forcibly separating her from her adoptive mother.

Rokayah Yusof (Kamariah's daughter and therefore Maria's adoptive niece) stated that during the 1998 visit, Maria still spoke Malay fluently and that she'd missed all the traditional Malay snacks when she celebrated Hari Raya together with Kamariah, whom Che Aminah adopted in Tokyo where she lived with her lecturer husband before Aminah returned to Malaya. Rokayah, who was 68 years old when she spoke about the visit in 2015, added that Maria had visited the grave of Che Aminah during her visit and even after the death of Maria, Maria's children maintained contact with her and her own children. Additionally, Maria had also been evidently unhappy in her life in the Netherlands, "a far cry from the kampong life she had enjoyed".

== See also ==
- 1964 race riots in Singapore
- 1969 race riots of Singapore
- List of riots in Singapore

== Notes ==
1. If and only if both conditions were met could the Muslim law practised in Singapore be applied to the case, which would render the marriage valid.
2. Karim Ghani was arrested along with several members of the Nadra Action Committee and held at the detention camp on Saint John's Island for 15 months under Emergency Regulation 20 for his part in the riots before being released on grounds of poor health.
3. Family tree of Johannes Gerardus Wolkenfelt, Maria and their ten children.
