= K. K. Ramachandra Pulavar =

Indian Tholpavakoothu artist

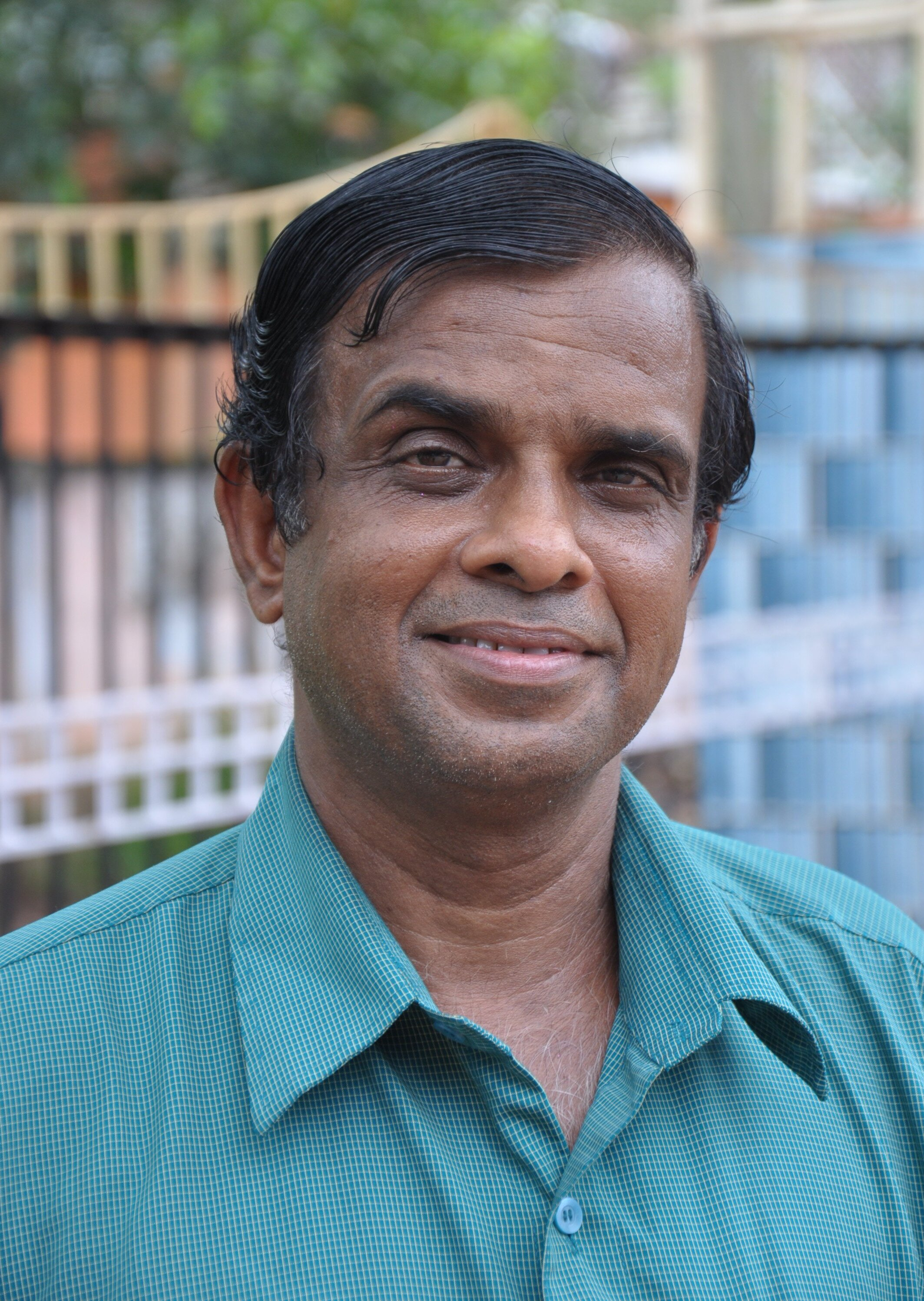
- Ramachandra Pulavar at sndp school pattathanam, kollam
- Born: K. K. Ramachandra; 20 May 1960 (age 66)
- Known for: Tholpavakoothu
- Awards: Padma Shri; Kerala Folklore Academy Award; Sangeet Natak Akademi Award

K. K. Ramachandra Pulavar (born 20 May 1960) is a Tholpavakoothu (a type of shadow puppetry) artist from Kerala, India. He used the Tholpavakoothu, which was confined to temple art, as public performances, and even to address socio-political issues including HIV awareness and COVID-19 awareness. He received many awards including the Padma Shri and Kerala Folklore Academy Award, in recognition of his work in the field of arts. In 2015 Ramachandra Pulavar received the Sangeet Natak Akademi Award for his contribution to Tholpavakoothu.

On Tholpavakoothu, he has authored two books, Shadow Puppet in Kerala in English and Tholpavakoothu in Malayalam.

== Biography ==
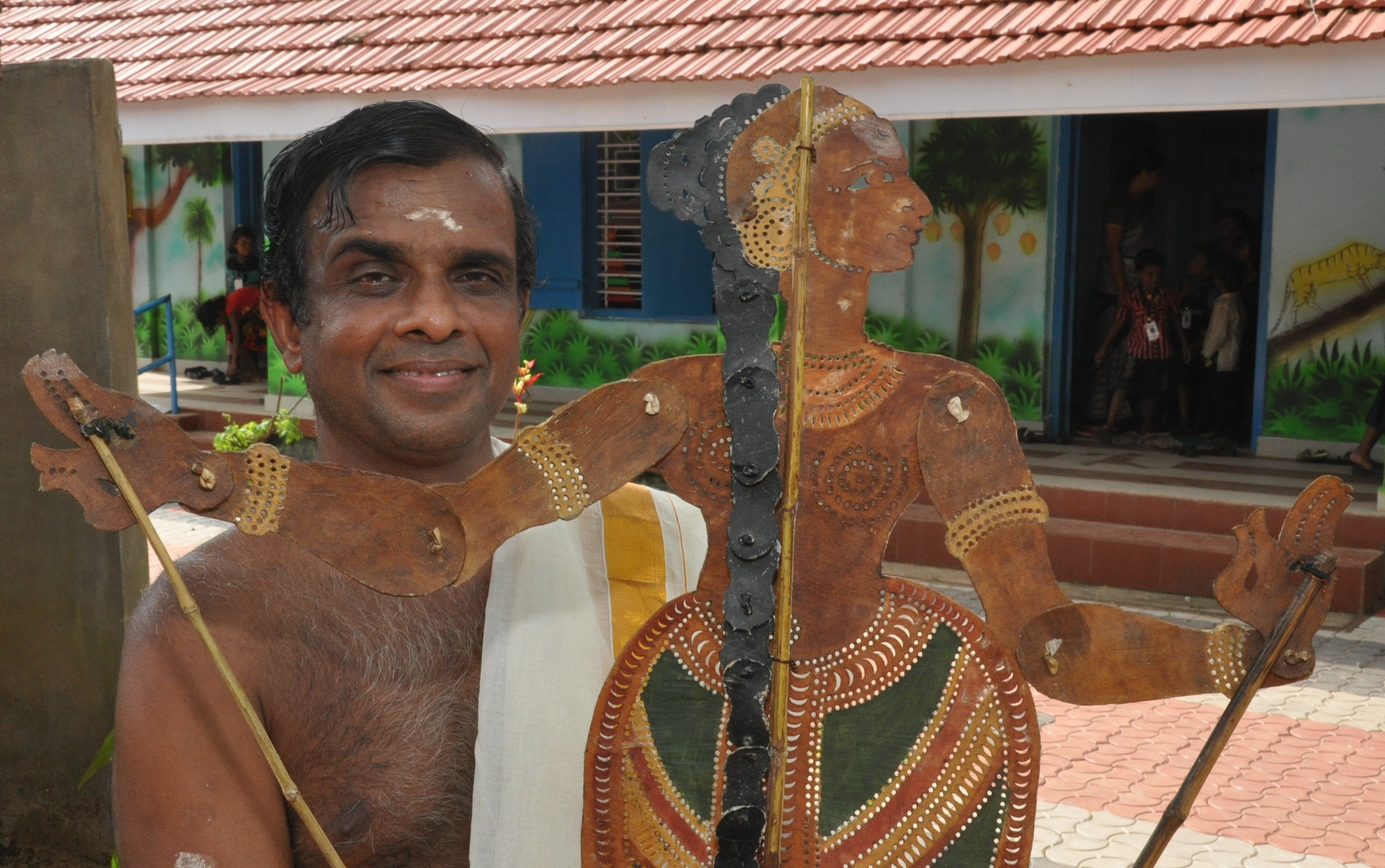
Ramachandra Pulavar with his leather puppet

Ramachandra Pulavar was born on 25 May 1960 in Shoranur, Palakkad district, Kerala. Ramachandra Pulavar was born in a family of puppet artists. He is the son of famous Tholpavakoothu artist K.L. Krishnankutty Pulavar. Father Krishnankutty Pulavar is also a Sangeet Natak Akademi Award winner. At the age of eight, he learned puppetry lessons from his father. At the age of 10, he made his debut at Aryankav Bhagavathy temple in Kavalapara.

=== Personal life ===
Ramachandra Pulavar and his wife Rajalakshmi have three children: Rajeev, Rahul, and Rajitha.

== Career ==
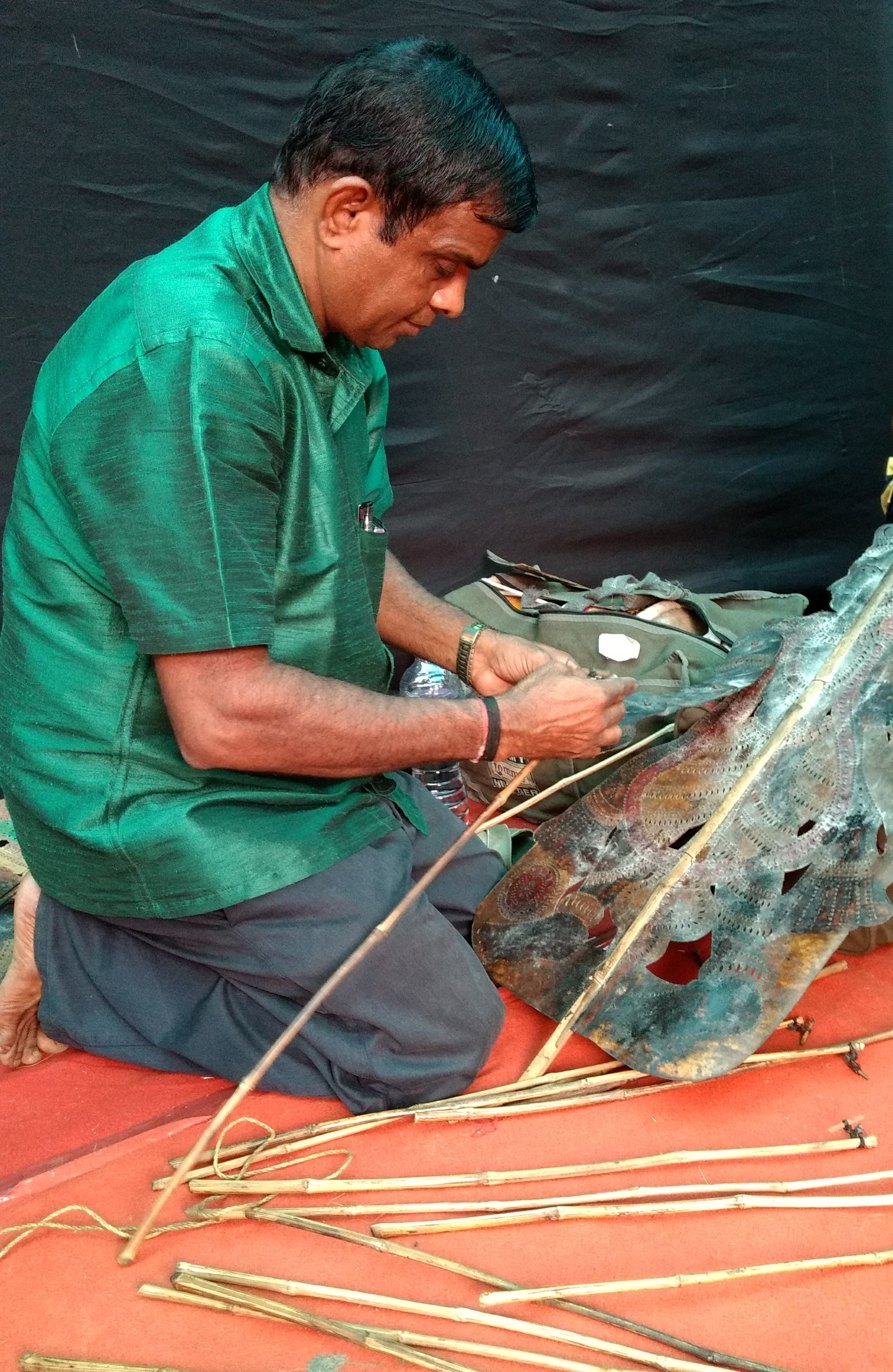
Ramachandra Pulavar preparing the puppets before the Koothu, Mumbai, 2017

Ramachandra Pulavar is being performed Tholpavakoothu in more than forty temples in Palakkad, Thrissur, and Malappuram districts. He began to pay full attention to this art form after resigning from his job at the Postal department. Ramachandra Pulavar was instrumental in bringing Tholpavakoothu, a traditional art form performed within the Hindu temples, to the outside world as public performances. He utilized Tholpavakoothu to address even socio-political issues. Gandhi Koothu (life of Mahatma Gandhi), yeshu Koothu (life of Jesus), Mahabali Charitam (life of Mahabali), Chandalabhikshuki (poem of Kumaran Asan, HIV Awareness, Corona Koothu (COVID-19 awareness), etc. are some of his non-ritual Tholpavakoothus.

Ramachandra Pulavar has performed Tholpavakoothu in various parts of India and various countries like Russia, Sweden, Spain, Ireland, Germany, Greece, Singapore, Japan, Holland, Poland, Israel, Thailand, Muscat, and China.

He is the Resource Person on Folk Arts and Puppetry at Sangeet Natak Academy. For the past 10 years, Pulavar has been training teachers in Tholpavakoothu in workshops and regularly conducts Tholpavakoothu demonstrations in various schools. From 1982, he taught Tholpavakoothu for five years at Sawantavadi, Maharashtra. As part of promoting Kerala culture in European countries, Tholpavakoothu programs have been organized in collaboration with the Department of Culture in Italy. In 1968, he performed Tholpavakoothu at the World Malayalam Conference. He toured Russia in 1979.

== Books written ==
Pulavar has authored an English book, titled Shadow Puppet in Kerala, for the National Folklore Support Center, and a Malayalam book titled Tholpavakoothu, for the Kerala Bhasha Institute.

== Awards and honors ==
From the Ministry of Culture, Government of India, Ramachandra Pulavar received Junior Fellowship in 1991 and Senior Fellowship in 2004. He also received many awards including the Thailand Government Award (2011), Dr. B.R. Ambedkar Award (2011), Kerala Folklore Academy Award (2012), Kerala Sangeetha Nataka Akademi Kalashree Puraskar (2013) and Padma Shri Award 2021, in recognition of his work in the field of arts. In 2015 Ramachandra Pulavar received the Sangeet Natak Akademi Award for his contribution to Tholpavakoothu.
