= Karim Ghani =

Karim Ghani (Tamil: கரீம் கனி) was a politician in South-East Asia of Indian origin. Before the Second World War Karim Ghani was a parliamentary secretary in Burma under Dr. Ba Maw, who was the first Burma Premier (1937–1939) and head of State of Burma from 1942 to 1945. During World War II, Ghani came to be the Minister for the state of Subhas Bose's Azad Hind government and was in Malaya. He was also the manager of "The Muslim Publishing House", the editor of the Malayan Tamil daily Malaya Nanban, as well as the editor of the Malay edition Dawn, under the name Sinaran. Ghani was also involved with the Muslim League and was the president of the All Malaya Muslim Missionary Society (AMMMS) and an official in several other organizations. After the end of World War II, Ghani was involved in Southeast Asian Muslim politics, most notably being involved in the Maria Hertogh riots in Singapore in 1950.

== Activities in Burma ==
Karim Gani was the editor of Tamil and Burmese newspapers in Burma. He was the secretary of the Youth League of the Chulia Association and was elected to the Legislative Assembly of Burma in 1932 and to the House of Representatives in 1936. His name was included in the list of persons "to be arrested immediately" in the British Intelligence report. Before World War II Karim Ghani was a parliamentary secretary in Burma under Dr. Ba Maw.

== Activities in Malaya ==
During World War II, Ghani became the Minister for State in Subhas Bose's Azad Hind government and was in Malaya. He was also the manager of "The Muslim Publishing House", the editor of the Malaysian Tamil daily Malayan Nanban, as well as the editor of the Malay edition Dawn, under the name Sinaran. Ghani was also involved with the Muslim League and was the president of the All Malaya Muslim Missionary Society (AMMMS) and an official in several other organizations. After the end of World War II, Ghani was involved in Southeast Asian Muslim politics, most notably being involved in the Maria Hertogh riots in Singapore in 1950.

== Maria Hertogh Riots ==
The Maria Hertogh riots or Natrah riots started on 11 December 1950 in Singapore, following the court decision to give the custody of Maria Hertogh (or Bertha Hertogh), then 13, to her biological Dutch Catholic parents after she had been raised as a Muslim under the care of Aminah binte Mohamed, whom she regarded as her mother. The riots lasted until noon on 13 December, with 18 killed, 173 injured and many properties damaged – the worst incident of its kind ever witnessed in Singapore. The court decision in August 1950 and the widespread news coverage of the legal battle for custody had evoked widespread agitations in the Malayan and Southeast Asian Muslim population who regarded Maria as a follower of the Muslim faith and came to interpret press coverage as portraying Maria as a Christian. An organization calling itself the Nadra Action Committee was formally constituted under the leadership of Karim Ghani. This extreme organization solicited support among local Muslims by distributing free copies of its newspaper, the Dawn (not the Dawn, an English paper published in Pakistan). Karim Ghani had also made an open speech at the Sultan Mosque on 8 December in which he mentioned jihad as a final resort. Ghani's comments were followed by widespread riots and violence beginning on 11 December and continued till the 13th. In total, 18 people were killed, among whom were seven Europeans or Eurasians, two police officers, and nine rioters shot by the police or military, 173 were injured, many of them seriously, 119 vehicles were damaged, and at least two buildings were set on fire. Subsequently, two weeks of 24-hour curfew were imposed, and it was a long time before complete law and order was re-established.

After the riot, the police set up a special investigation unit which detained 778 people, among them Karim Ghani, who was arrested along with several members of the Nadra Action Committee and held at the detention camp on Saint John's Island for 15 months under Emergency Regulation 20 for his part in the riots before being released on the grounds of poor health.

Maria was represented by David Marshal a prominent lawyer from Singapore who in his later years had to remark, "if this case would have been heard in any other circumstances the verdict would have been otherwise". He suggested that the British sought to maintain their influence during the case, which was perceived by some as favoring Christian interests over Muslim concerns.

Following the riots, numerous individuals, including members of the Muslim community, were charged in connection with the events. Among them were many Tamil Muslim leaders who were sentenced to be hanged. These Tamil Muslim traders were the Islamic icons for the newly independent Malaya.

All of the convicted were released, but the British authorities sought to remove Ghani from the colony due to his political involvement. Being an Indian national, Ghani was offered to the Indian government by the British but they refused, noting his record and due to the ongoing election period. Bashir Mallal made contact with some of his associates in Pakistan after which Inamullah Khan, Secretary General of World Muslim Congress, formally invited him to Karachi. He restarted his career as a publisher in Karachi. His political activism did not gain significant support in Pakistan at the time. He continued to be critical of the British and their policies. Sources, including Haji Maideen, suggest that Ghani died in Pakistan sometime between 1952 and 1960, although the exact date remains unclear.
