= Umar Pulavar Tamil Language Centre =

Tamil academic institution in Singapore

Coordinates: 1.3142°N 103.8593°E

Umar Pulavar Tamil Language Centre, formerly known as St George’s Road Tamil Language Centre, is an academic institution for teaching Tamil language in Singapore. The institution is named after famed Tamil poet Umaru Pulavar.

After the closure of Umar Pulavar Tamil High School in 1982, St George’s Road Tamil Language Centre was renamed as Umar Pulavar Tamil Language Centre in 1983 to preserve the name of the high school.

The centre offers the Tamil language elective programme under the National Elective Tamil Programme by the Ministry of Education.
