= Rajeev Pulavar =

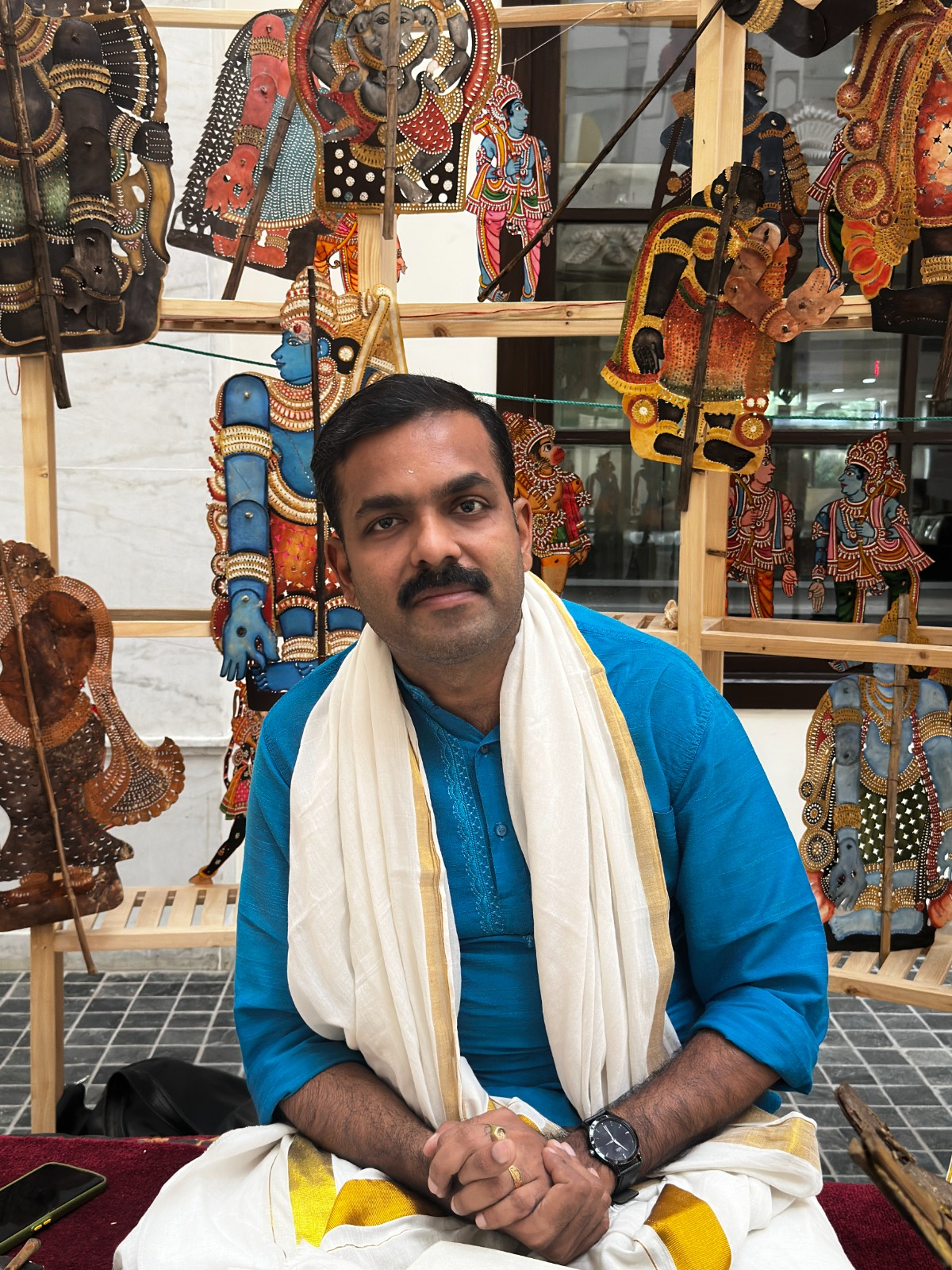
- Indian Tholpavakoothu artist Rajeev Pulavar at his workshop in Palakkad, Kerala
- Born: 1 June 1989 (age 37)
- Known for: Tholpavakoothu
- Awards: Sangeet Natak Akademi Ustad Bismillah Khan Yuva Puraskar

Rajeev Pulavar (born 1 June 1989) is an Indian shadow puppeteer and artist from Kerala, known for his contributions to the traditional art form of Tholpavakoothu. He is the recipient of several national and international honours, including the Sangeet Natak Akademi Ustad Bismillah Khan Yuva Puraskar in 2016 for his contributions to Tholpavakoothu.

== Early Life and Childhood ==
Rajeev Pulavar was born in Koonathara village of the Palakkad district, Kerala, into a family with an ancestry in Tholpavakoothu, a traditional South Indian form of shadow puppetry. For centuries, Rajeev's family has been preserving and propagating Tholpavakoothu as their cultural heritage—especially to pass on traditional knowledge embedded in the art. Rajeev and his family are among the last few artists in Kerala who practise the hereditary craft.

Rajeev's early childhood consisted of watching and assisting in performances put on by his grandfather, the renowned puppeteer Krishnankutty Pulava Rajeev, and his father, Padma Shri K. K. Ramachandra Pulavar. At the age of eight, he began his training in the art under family guidance. Through rigorous dedication and practice, Rajeev has learned over 9,000 verses of the Ramavataram (Kamba Ramayana), which forms a core part of Tholpavakoothu performances.

== Artistic Contributions and Innovations ==
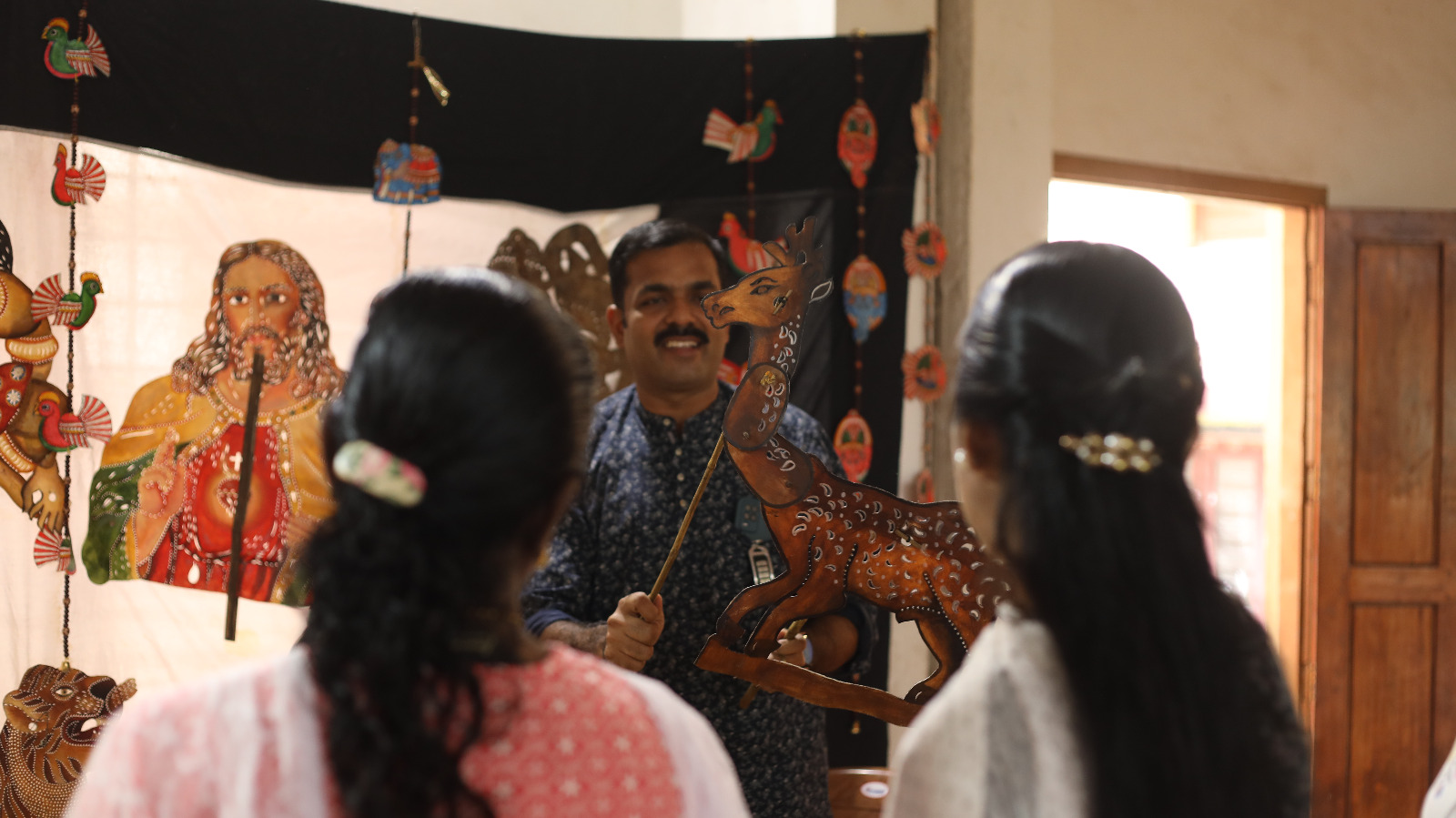
Rajeev Pulavar teaching Tholpavakoothu to female students at his workshop

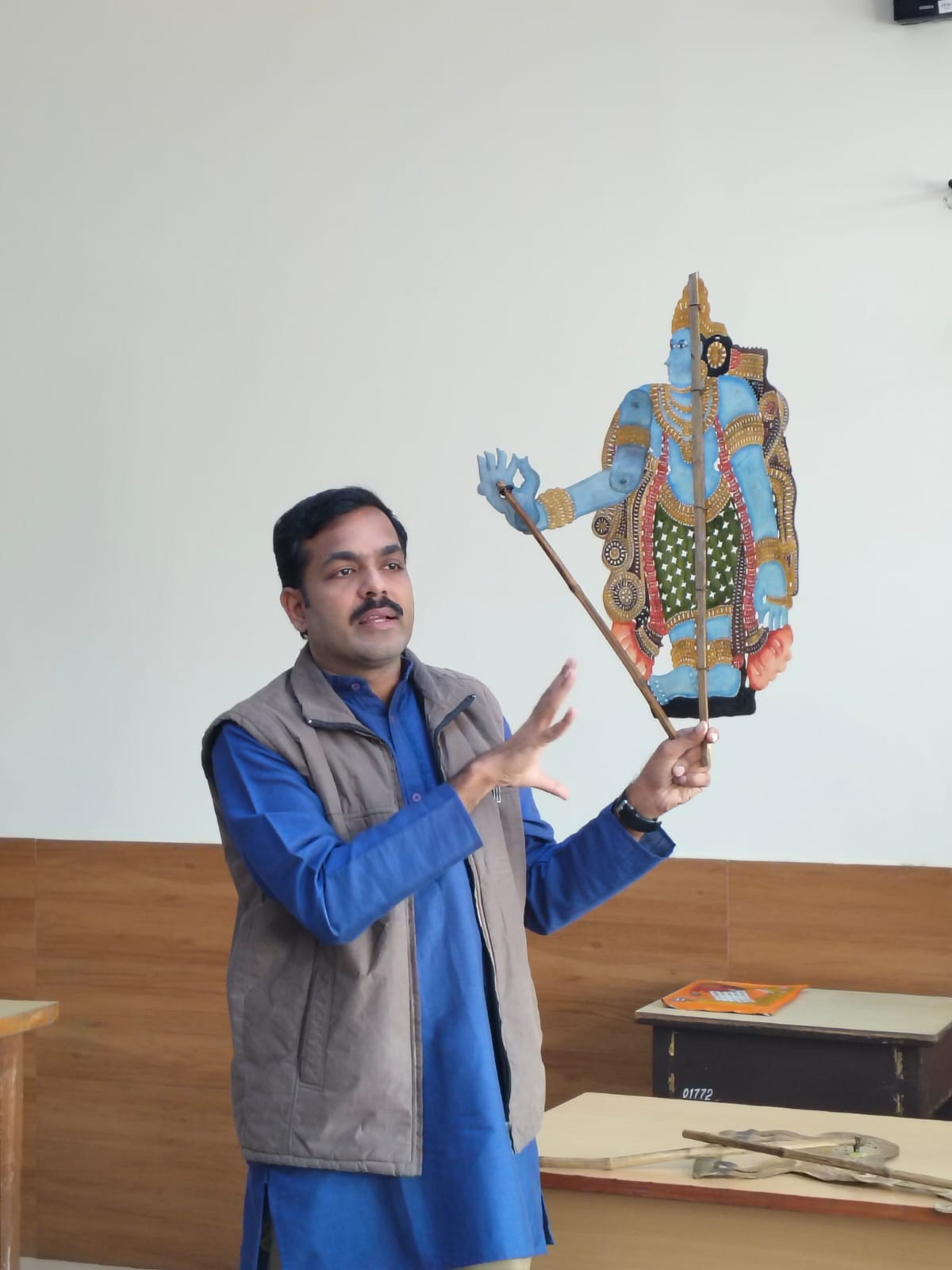
Artist Rajeev Pulavar demonstrating a metal creation

Rajeev has introduced numerous innovations to the ancient art of Tholpavakoothu, which includes modernizing puppet designs and making the artform more inclusive. Historically, women were not allowed to perform in this form of puppetry. This has changed under initiatives led by Rajeev and his father. Rajeev focuses on training female puppeteers and young students at his workshop, and leads a dedicated troupe of female performers under his guidance.

Contemporary themes that Rajeev and his father have introduced for the preservation of the artform include stories about the life of Mahatma Gandhi, Jesus Christ, and political figures. He has also instrumentalized the artform within Kerala to run social awareness campaigns on topics such as road safety, drug use prevention, and COVID-19. In 2013, he made history in Tholpavakoothu by adapting Shakespeare's Othello into the ancient art.

== Performances and Outreach ==
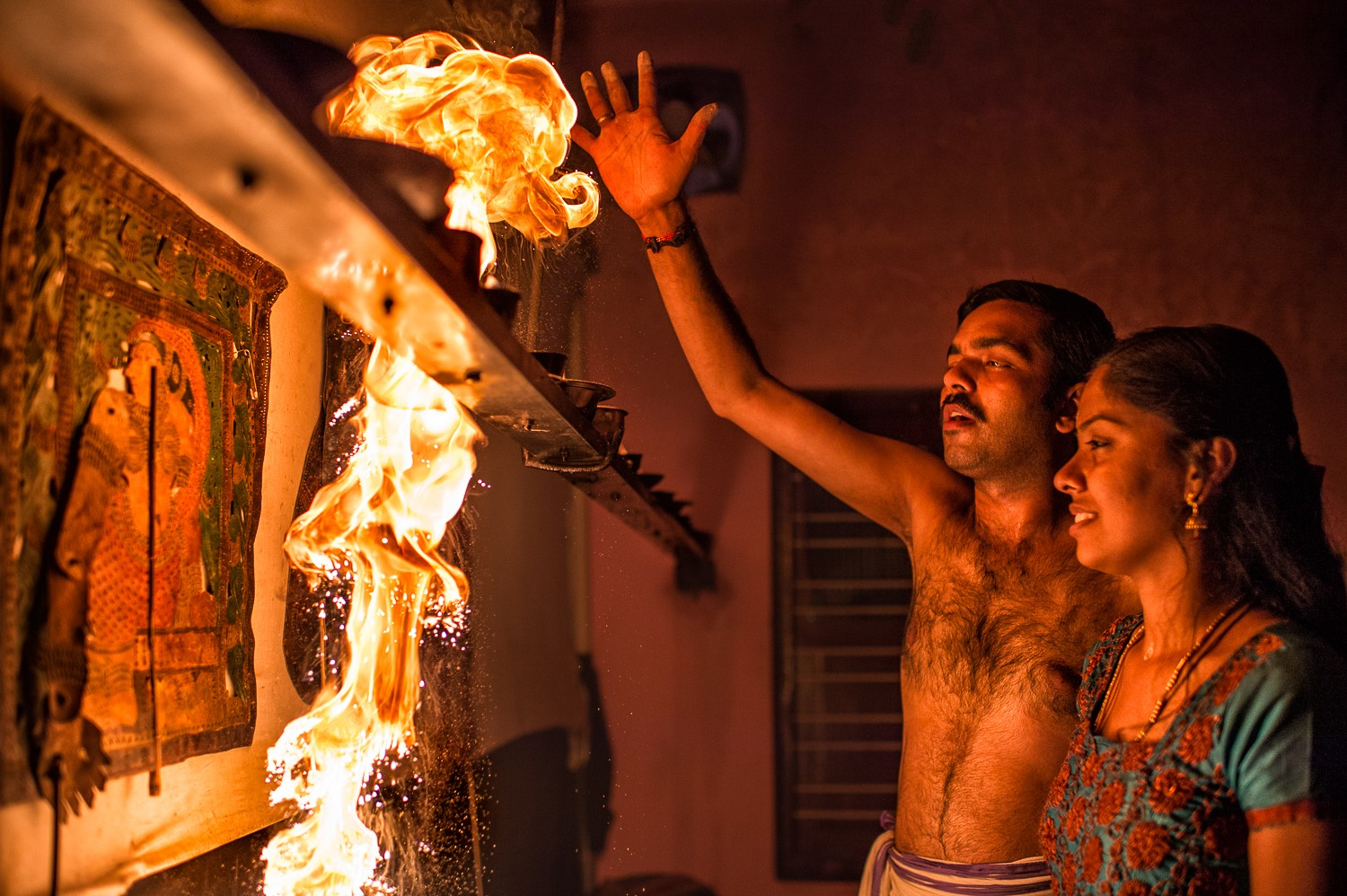
Artist Rajeev Pulavar demonstrating the use of fire in Tholpavakoothu

Rajeev has worked to expand the reach of Tholpavakoothu beyond temple premises, where it was historically and exclusively performed, to new arenas and countries. His advocacy for the preservation for the artform has led him to perform on international stages, including Thailand, China, Singapore, Muscat, Hungary, and Israel. His efforts to bring awareness to the art includes conducting regular annual performances in over 40 temples across Kerala, between December and June. Other efforts include performing Tholpavakoothu as a ritual for female deities in South Indian temples, which can last from anywhere between 7 and 71 days. Rajeev has also staged over 180 public shows, bringing the artform to prominent cultural events within Kerala such as the Soorya Festival.

He also contributes his puppet-making, recitation, and performance skills to exhibitions, educational institutions, and cultural centres. Each year, he hand produces over 250 leather puppets representing various characters, and focuses on democratizing the once-exclusive art form through workshops for both foreigners and local students. Rajeev and his father run a puppetry institute in the district of Palakkad, which he has opened up to visitors and tourists to make the art more accessible.

== Awards and recognition ==
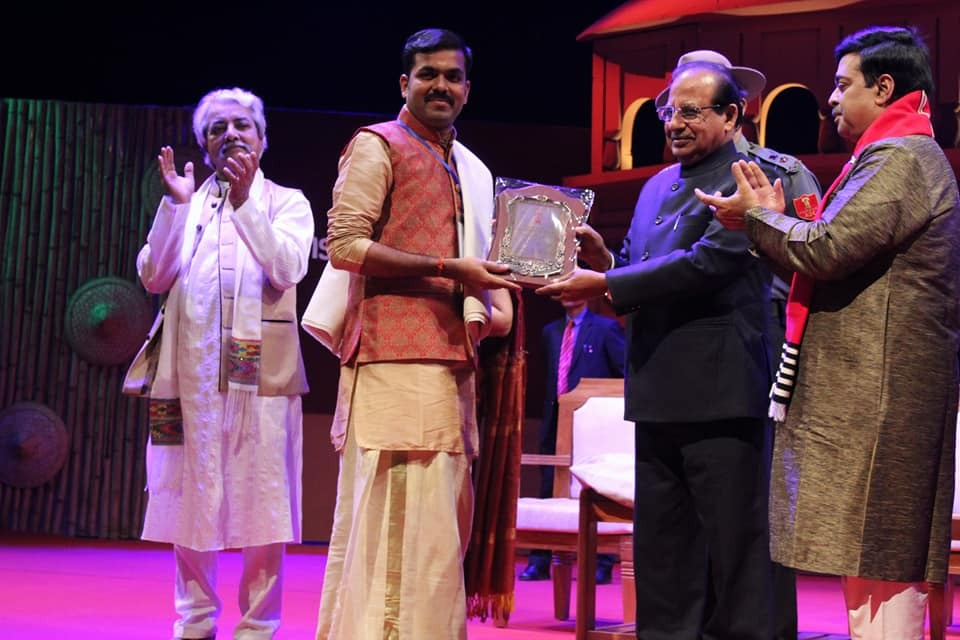
Rajeev Pulavar Receiving the Sangeet Natak Akademi Ustad Bismillah Khan Yuva Puraskar award in 2016

- Sangeet Natak Akademi Ustad Bismillah Khan Yuva Puraskar, 2016
- Young Talented Artiste Award, Kerala Folklore Academy, 2015
- Young Talented Artiste Award, Kerala Sangeet Natak Akademi, 2011
- Young Talented Artiste Award, South Zone Cultural Centre, Thanjavur, 2007

=== Workshops ===
- Akhyan Puppet Exhibition, Indira Gandhi National Centre for the Arts (IGNCA), 2010
- International Arts and Craft Fair Jerusalem, 2007
- Natya Darsana Puppet Workshop, Kozhikode, 2006
