= Chicken 65 =

South Indian chicken dish

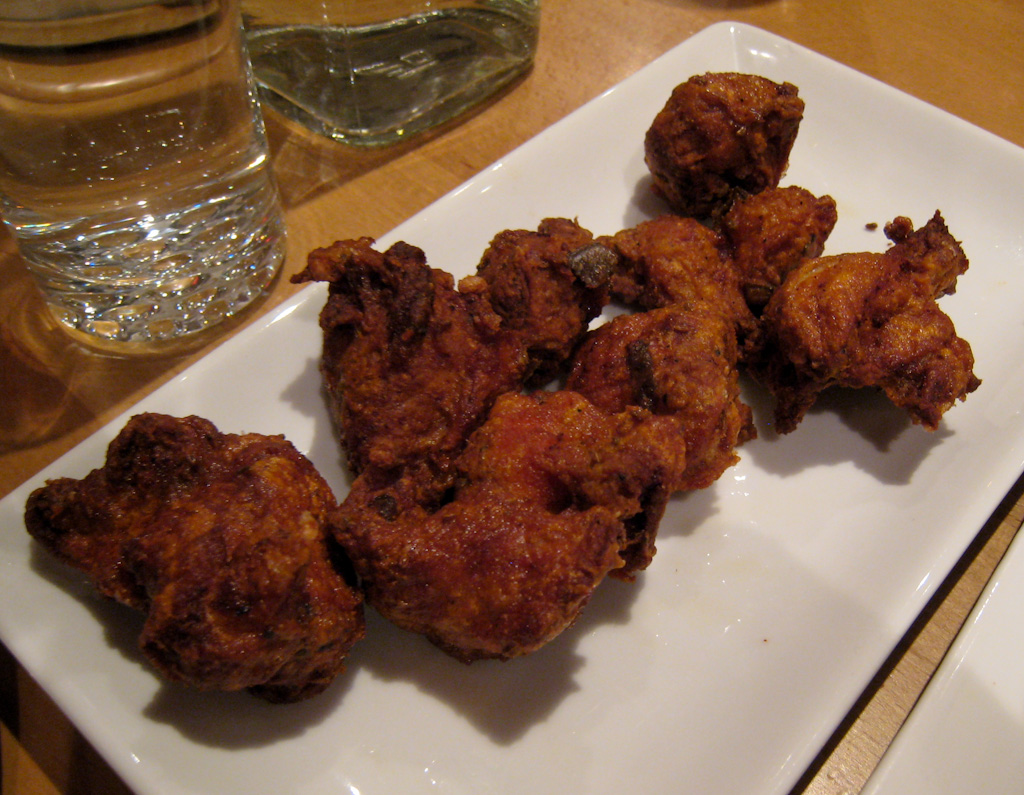
Chicken 65

Chicken 65 is a spicy, deep-fried chicken dish originating from Hotel Buhari, Chennai, India, as an entrée, or quick snack. The flavour of the dish can be attributed to red chillies, but the exact set of ingredients for the recipe can vary. Although it is now commonly prepared with boneless chicken, it was originally prepared with bone-in chicken. Chicken 65 is usually served with an onion and lemon garnish. Vegetarian variants such as "Paneer 65" or "Gobhi 65" use paneer or cauliflower instead. While the name "Chicken 65" is universally used to refer to the dish, there are many different theories claiming its origins.

== Origins ==
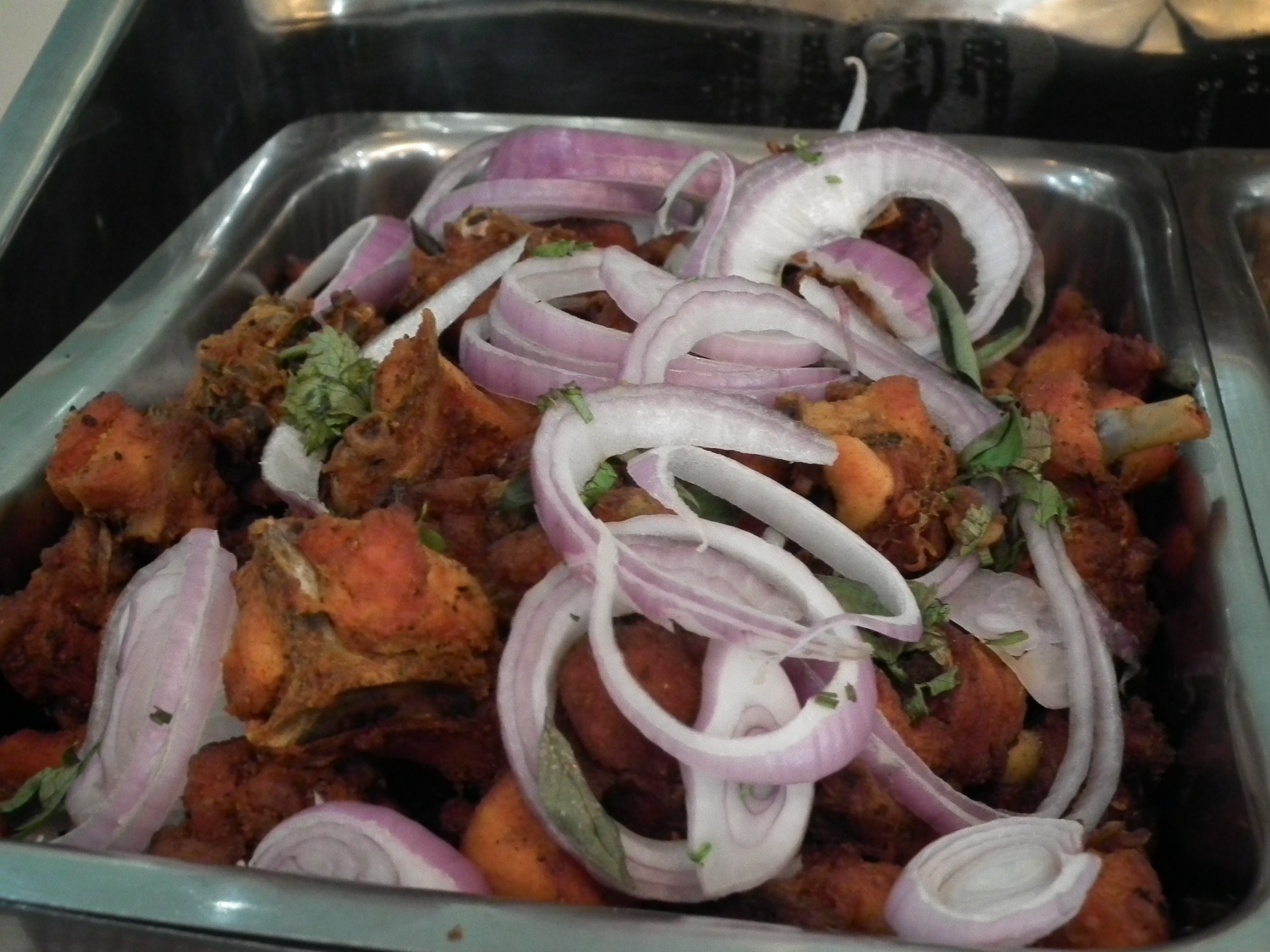
Chicken 65 with onion and coriander garnish

Chicken 65 was introduced in 1965 by the Buhari Hotel, which gave the dish its name. It is credited to the hotel's founder, A. M. Buhari, who regularly added new dishes to the menu. The hotel later followed the same naming convention with Chicken 78, Chicken 82 and Chicken 90.

== Myths ==
The dish's popularity has produced several unsupported explanations of its name, which conflict with the hotel's own account:

- It was a simple meal created for Indian soldiers in 1965.
- It was the 65th item on a menu.
- The chicken is marinated for 65 days.
- The chicken must be 65 days old.
- The chicken is cut into 65 pieces.
- The recipe contains 65 chilli peppers.

== See also ==
- List of chicken dishes
- List of deep-fried foods
