= Umaru Pulavar =

Tamil Muslim poet

- Born: 4 December 1642; Nagalapuram, Ettayapuram, Madurai Nayak Kingdom (now in Thoothukudi District, Tamil Nadu, India)
- Died: 28 July 1703 (aged 60); Ettayapuram, Carnatic Sultanate (now in Thoothukudi District, Tamil Nadu, India)
- Known for: Poetry

Umaru Pulavar Memorial, Ettayapuram

Umaru Pulavar Memorial (Inside), Ettayapuram

Umaru Pulavar (4 December 1642 – 28 July 1703) was a Tamil Muslim Rowther poet from Tamil Nadu, India. Umaru Pulavar was born in 1642 in the town of Ettayapuram in Thoothukudi district. He is celebrated as one of the greatest Islamic poets of India.

== Early life and family ==
Umaru pulavar's forefather was from Nagalapuram, before moving to Ettayapuram where the poet was born. Umaru Pulavar's literary talents flourished under Kadikai Muthu Pulavar that is only in Tamil language (Tamil: கடிகை முத்து புலவர்), court poet of the Ettayapuram Zamin. At the age of 16, Umaru Pulavar stole the national limelight by winning a literary debate with Vallai Varundhi, a renowned poet from North India. Umaru Pulavar was then made the court poet of the Ettayapuram Zamin. But he was not able to learn Arabic grammar. While learning the Arabic language his master went for his essential work for earning money. His family and heirs were awarded with Pulavar title by government of Tamil Nadu, and they carry the initial before their bio initial. Pulavar died on 28 July 1703. PF Nazeer, one of his last heirs with some unpublished work poems died recently of cancer. His family has set up a trust for education and social reforms for poor people on his anniversary.

== Literary works ==
He was requested by Seethakaathi to pen Seerapuranam, considered to be one of the best works in Tamil Muslim literature until date, depicting the biography of Nabi. It contains 5,027 poems in three ‘Kandams’ (parts), which are Vilathathu Kandam, Noobuvathu Kandam and Hijurathu Kandam. Each of the ‘Kandams’ narrates various stages of the life of Nabi.

Muthu Mozhil Malai and Sethakathi wedding poems are among his other literary works.

== Legacy ==
His memorial at Ettayapuram in Tuticorin district was renovated by the government of Tamil Nadu and was declared open by the then Speaker of legislative assembly and the then ministers. The Umar Pulavar Tamil Language Center in Singapore named after the scholar strives for providing quality education in Tamil language in Singapore. A social welfare trust established by Professor Muhammadu Sathik Raja on 14 August 2014 named as "Omar - Bharathi Educational Trust" is constituted at Thirupuvanam Pudur in the regard of both the poets from Ettayapuram. The trust has also opened branches in Ariyalur district and in Theni district. The Islamiya ilakkiya kazhagam gives award every year to eminent Tamil scholars in the name of Umaru Pulavar.
