= Tamil Nadu Thowheed Jamath =

Islamic organization in Tamil Nadu, India

Tamil Nadu Thowheed Jamath-TNTJ
- Flag of TNTJ
- Abbreviation: TNTJ
- Founded: 16 May 2004
- Legal status: Active
- Purpose: Preaching Islam
- Location: Tamil Nadu, India
- Region served: India, Sri Lanka United Arab Emirates, Qatar, Saudi Arabia, Kuwait, Malaysia, Bahrain, Oman, United Kingdom, France, United States of America, Australia, London, Singapore
- Services: Blood Donation; Children Orphanage; Elders Orphanage; Livelihood Assistance; Educational Assistance; Health Awareness programs Disaster Aid, Relief and Recovery
- Official language: Main Language; Tamil; Other Languages; Malayalam; Urdu; Sinhala; English; Hindi
- Key people: State Governance Committee
- Publication: Nadunilai Samuthayam; Egathuvam
- Website: www.tntj.net www.onlinetntj.com

Tamil Nadu Thowheed Jamath (TNTJ) is an Islamic organization based in Tamil Nadu, India. It was founded in 2004. TNTJ claims to preach true Islam to Muslims and non-Muslims as per Quran and Prophetic ways. Ideologically due to its theological stand, it considers only a sovereign state can take up weapons and any thing contrary is against the fundamentals of Islam. TNTJ is also involved in social activities and awareness of condemning extremism through rallies and propaganda. TNTJ's ideology is influenced by Wahabism.

== Administrative Structure ==
The Tamil Nadu Thowheed Jamath (TNTJ) is structured with various committees to oversee its functions. Below are the details of the current administration.

=== State Administration ===
Position	Name
State President	R. Abdul Kareem
State General Secretary	Mujibur Rahman
State Treasurer	Kanchi A. Ibrahim
State Vice President	K. Dawood Kaiser
State Deputy General Secretary	A.K. Abdul Rahim
State Secretary	Kanchi K. Siddique
State Secretary	I. Ansari
State Secretary	S. Syed Mohammed
State Secretary	N. Mohammed Faisal
State Secretary	C.V. Imran
State Secretary	S. Yusuf Ali
State Secretary	S. Mohammed Yasir
State Secretary	Abdul Muhsin
State Secretary	Rafiq Sivagangai
State Secretary	A. Mohammed Yusuf
State Secretary	M.S. Seth Mohammed
State Secretary	N. Al Ameen
State Secretary	S.A. Mohammed Oli
State Secretary	Peroskhan
State Secretary	Amjad Salem
State Secretary	A. Sabir Ali
State secretary	Abdul Samad
State Secretary	Habibullah

=== Management Committee ===
Position	Name
Management Committee President	M. Shamsullah Rahmani
Management Committee Member	E. Mohammed
Management Committee Member	M.I. Sulaiman

=== Audit Committee ===
Position	Name
Audit Committee President	M.S. Sulaiman BAI
Audit Committee Member	E. Farooq
Audit Committee Member	Syed Ali

== Social activities ==
Donation of blood is highly encouraged among TNTJ followers. It has won government awards for making the highest amount of blood donations in Tamil Nadu in about 10 successive years. It has offered help and support during tsunami relief in several affected areas. Its relief program during Chennai flood of 2015, whose estimated cost was twenty five crore, was a noticeable one. TNTJ has also created awareness among masses about dengue fever.

== About ==
=== Protests ===
TNTJ has held demonstrations and protests across Tamil Nadu several times on various issues including reconstruction of Babri Masjid, removal of liquor shops and load shedding. Its leaders encourages followers to observe peaceful protests and to avoid any inconvenience to traffic. In September 2012, the U.S. Consulate encouraged U.S. citizens traveling in and around Chennai to exercise caution and monitor local media for security updates, owing to a protest by TNTJ following an anti-Islamic movie. On 28 January 2014, TNTJ organized a protest to demand increase in reservation for Muslims in Tamil Nadu.

=== Controversies ===
As reported by three references provided, on March 19, 2022, Tamil Nadu police arrested a leader of the Tamil Nadu Thowheed Jamath over allegations of issuing death threat to the judges of the Karnataka High Court concerning the court's verdict on a case related to wearing hijab in schools and colleges where the school or college uniform is mandated.
