= Tamil Nadu Muslim Munnetra Kazhagam =

Tamil Nadu Muslim Munnetra Kazhagam TMMK
- Abbreviation: TMMK
- Leader: MH Jawahirullah MLA
- Founded: 1995
- Headquarters: Mannadi, Chennai, Tamil Nadu
- Student wing: Samuga neethi Manavar Iyakkam (SMI)
- Youth wing: TMMK Youth Wing
- Women's wing: Tamilnadu Muslim Magaleer Paeravai
- Ideology: Muslim nationalism Tamil nationalism Dravidianism
- Colours: black and white
- ECI status: Registered

Party flag

Website
- www.tmmk.in

Tamil Nadu Muslim Munnetra Kazhagam (Tamil Nadu Muslim Progress Conference) or TMMK is a Muslim non-governmental organisation established in the state of Tamil Nadu in India in 1995. The TMMK has described itself in news releases as "a mass based" organisation.

== Background ==
The objective of TMMK is to protect the rights of the Muslim community in a democratic manner. TMMK has its branch offices in all the districts of Tamil Nadu and in several villages of the state. It also has its foreign offices in Malaysia, Kuwait, Saudi Arabia and other Persian Gulf countries and has more than 1 lakh members. It was involved in Tsunami relief work and does social services including blood donation camps, eye camps and free ambulance services for the poor. Dignified Burial and Cremation Services One of TMMK's most significant contributions was the management of deceased COVID-19 victims.Volunteers were trained to perform rituals according to the specific religious beliefs of the deceased, whether it involved a traditional burial or assistance with cremation at a crematorium.TMMK's existing network of free and low-cost ambulances became a lifeline during the pandemic.The TMMK medical wing's "108-style" ambulance service and their volunteer-led burial teams received formal appreciation from various district collectors and police officials across Tamil Nadu for their role in managing the crisis.

== Rallies and protests ==
TMMK invites public to hold peaceful protests and demonstrations for demanding rights of Muslims. In February 2005, the TMMK urged the then-Chief Minister Jayalalithaa Jayaram to direct the Wakf Board to send all its communications only in the Tamil language to the administrators of mosques. A March 2007 rally organised by the TMMK in New Delhi drew support from the Association of Indian Muslims (AIM) of America. The TMMK has campaigned for the reservation of seats in educational institutions and the ear-marking of entrepreneurship schemes for Muslims in Tamil Nadu as per the recommendations of the Sachar Committee. The Tamil Nadu Thawheedh Jamaath (TNTJ) has been termed "a breakaway group" of the organisation.

Every year TMMK observes the anniversary of Babri Masjid demolition in a peaceful manner. These protests draw huge number of people from across the Tamil Nadu state and demand the arrest of 68 perpetrators including Atal Bihari Vajpayee, Balasaheb Thackeray, LK Advani and Murli Manohar Joshi as implicated by Liberhan commission. The organisation has also stages many protests for the protection Tamil Nadu fishermen and dalits.

== Manithaneya Makkal Katchi ==
In early 2009, a new political party Manithaneya Makkal Katchi was launched after an amendment to the bylaws. The party contested in the parliamentary election the same year in 4 constituencies and polled 68,346 votes. But in the 2011 Assembly election, MMK allied with AIADMK and won 2 of 3 seats contested.

== Views on terrorism ==
TMMK has condemned several acts of terrorism in India and in foreign lands. When the Al-Qaeda released a video related to Indian sub-continent, TMMK condemned it and advised Indian Muslims to ignore such hate messages. The leader of TMMK said “this (message) will only help security agencies in country to further target Muslim youth in case a terrorist act does take place.” In several occasion, TMMK has also condemned Israel for its brutality against Palestinian People. It has also raised voices for UN intervention to stop genocide of Palestinians. Similarly, TMMK has protested the genocide of Tamil people in Sri Lanka.

== Criticism ==
On 6 December 2003, 450 activists of the TMMK were arrested for attempting stage a protest rally. Similar arrests were made earlier in 2000 where TMMK members were implicated.
