= People's science movement =

The people's science movement (PSM) aims to popularise science and scientific outlook among common people. Kerala Sasthra Sahithya Parishad, Bharat Gyan Vigyan Samiti, Assam Science Society, Bigyan Prachar Samiti (Orissa), We the Sapiens and the All India Peoples Science Network are some popular people's science movements in India.

== People's science movements in India ==
- Bangiya Bijnan Parishad (1948)
- Kerala Sasthra Sahithya Parishad (1962)
- Pondicherry Science Forum (1985)
- Bharat Gyan Vigyan Samiti
- Tamil Nadu Science Forum (1980)
- Jan Vignana Vedika
- Delhi Science Forum (1978)
- Assam Science Society (1956)
- Tripura Science Forum
- Bigyan Prachar Samiti, Odisha
- Bharat Gyan Vigyan Samiti Uttar Pradesh
- Bharat Gyan Vigyan Samiti Haryana
- Bharat Gyan Vigyan Samiti Utharkhand
- We, the Sapiens
- All India Peoples Science Network (1988)
