= A. Achuthan =

Indian environmental activist (1933–2022)

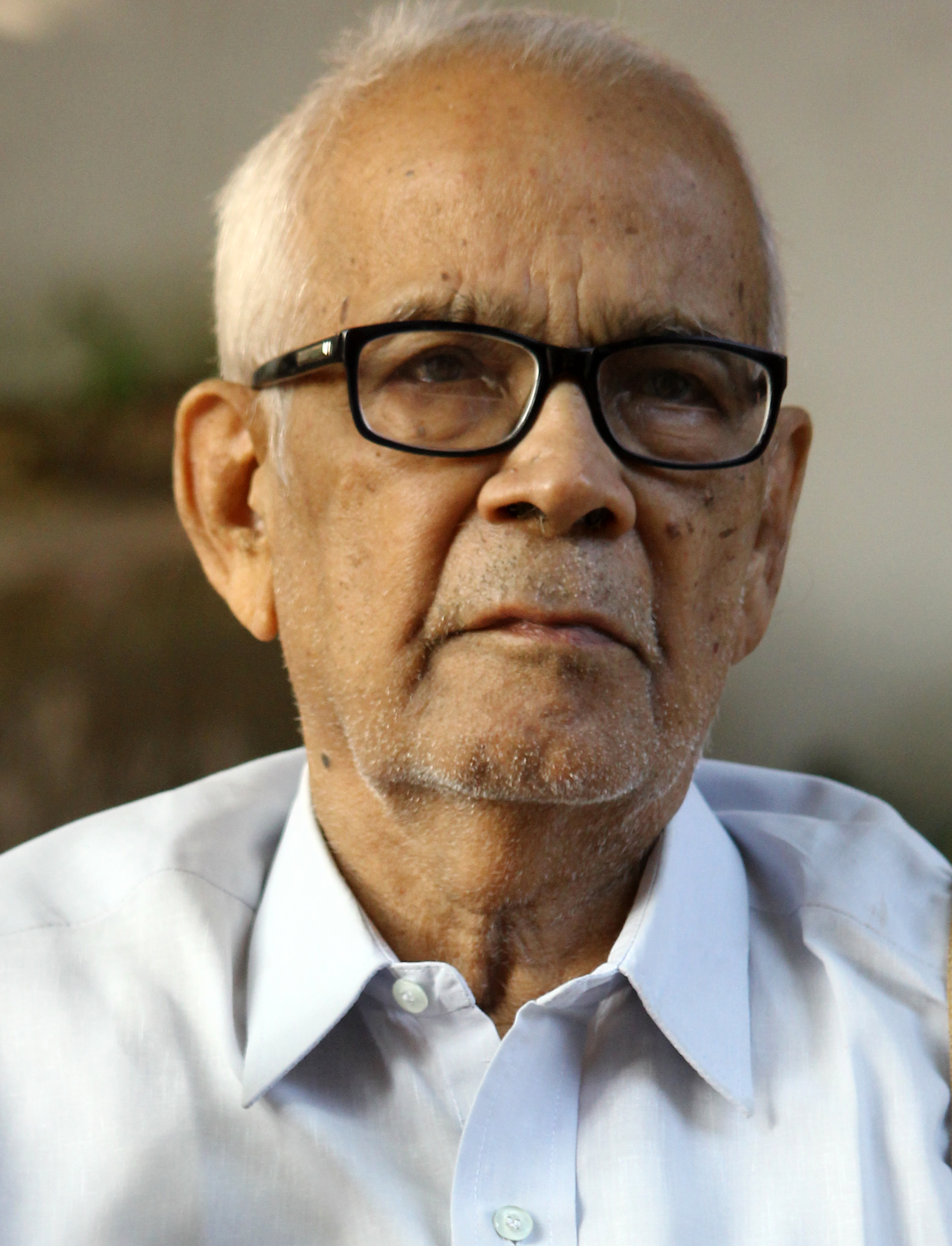
- Born: 1 April 1933; Avittathur near Irinjalakuda, Kingdom of Cochin (present-day Thrissur district of Kerala)
- Died: 10 October 2022 (aged 89); Kozhikode, Kerala, India
- Education: University of Wisconsin–Madison College of Engineering; IIT Madras; University of Kerala
- Occupations: Environmental activist; academic
- Known for: Environmental activism in Kerala
- Awards: Kerala Sahitya Akademi Award for Scholarly Literature (2014)

A. Achuthan was an Indian environmental activist and science writer from Kerala. He was involved in many environmental protests in the state. His book Paristhithi Padanathinu Oramukham [An introduction to environmental studies] won the Kerala Sahitya Akademi Award for Scholarly Literature in 2014.

== Biography ==
A. Achuthan was born on 1 April 1933 to Ikanda Variyar, a sub-registrar, and Madhavi Variyar, a civil servant, in Avittathur near Irinjalakuda in present-day Thrissur district of Kerala. After completing graduation in civil engineering from the University of Kerala, he obtained a master's degree in civil engineering from the University of Wisconsin and a doctorate from IIT Madras. As a civil engineer, he specialised in hydraulics.

=== Personal life and death ===
Achuthan and his wife Sulochana had two children, Aruna, a VLSI design engineer in Canada, and Anupama A. Manjula, an associate professor in the Department of Pathology at Manjeri Government Medical College,. He died on 10 October 2022 at Kozhikode. As per his wishes, his body was handed over to the Kozhikode Government Medical College for academic purposes, without being placed for public viewing or paying homage.

== Career ==
Achuthan started his career as a demonstrator at the Government Engineering College, Thiruvananthapuram in 1954. Later he worked at the Public and Engineering Division of the Public Works Department, Government of Kerala. While working in PWD, he did research on 'Total Sanitation' at the Indian Council for Medical Research. He left PWD for a teaching career and worked as a teacher at Thrissur and Thiruvananthapuram engineering colleges and Kozhikode Regional Engineering College. He has also served as Dean and Director of Academic Staff College at the University of Calicut.

In 1962, the same year he arrived in Kozhikode as a teacher, the Kerala Sasthra Sahithya Parishad was formed in the city. Although he did not attend any of the first meetings of Parishad, he was active in literature and cultural scene of Kozhikode in the 1960s. In a poetry circle, he met another Irinjalakuda resident, N. V. Krishna Warrier. Upon Warrier's request Achuthan became a member of the Parishad in 1965. In 1966, he became the general secretary of the Parishad and in 1969, he became its state president. It was during his time that the Parishad was registered as a society. It was first registered with the home address of Achuthan.

For the Parishad, he focused on new methods of waste disposal, proper mosquito control, the design of a smoke-free stove (now called the parishad stove), ways to save electricity, drinking water conservation measures, and low-cost building construction using local resources. He prepared many books and pamphlets to promote these. The most important of these is Ningalkkoru Veedu [A Home for You], which was prepared in collaboration with Vincent Paul, a colleague at REC.

Achuthan was a member of the expert committees of the Central Department of Science and Technology, UGC, Kerala State Planning Board, and the Board of Studies, Faculty, and Academic Council of various universities. He also served as the editor of the science periodicals Sastra Gati and Ore Oru Bhoomi.

== Activism ==
Achuthan was a person who actively intervened in environmental issues in Kerala. He was a member of the People's Inquiry Commission related to the Plachimada protest and the Inquiry Commission related to the Endosulfan disaster, and was also active in the Save Silent Valley protest. At the time of Silent Valley issue, he was a member of the Task Forces on Energy under the Kerala State Planning Board. The first official report detailing the plight of endosulfan victims in Kerala was prepared under the leadership of Achuthan. He was also involved in other environmental protests in the state including issues related to Jeerakapara, Madayipara, Mavoor Gwalior Rayons and Njeliyanparamba waste treatment plant. Achuthan was also at the forefront of the formation of the Kerala Environmental Conservation Committee in 1974 to deal exclusively with environmental issues.

== Contributions ==
Achuthan published 20 books, twelve scientific papers in various international scientific publications, and more than a hundred scientific articles.

== Awards and honors ==
His book titled Paristhithi Padanathinu Oramukham (meaning: An introduction to environmental studies) won the 2014 Kerala Sahitya Akademi Award for Scholarly Literature. He had also received many awards including the Silent Valley National Park Jubilee Award and the Kerala State Science, Technology and Environment Council Award, for his environmental activism.
