= All India Peoples Science Network =

- Abbreviation: AIPSN
- Founded: 1988
- Type: People's Movement (reg under Indian Society act)
- Location: Kerala
- President: Dr.Sabyasachi Chatterjee
- General Secretary: Prof.P.Rajamanickam
- Treasurer: Dr.S.Krishnaswamy
- Website: https://aipsn.net/

All India Peoples Science Network (AIPSN) is a national network of Peoples Science Movements of India. It was established in the first All India Peoples Science Congress, organised in 1988 at Kannur in Kerala State. The attempt to establish a national platform for science organisations in India started in the late 1960s. By that time, there were Science organisations in West Bengal, Assam, Orissa, Kerala and Maharashtra. In many other states, there were committed scientists who were interested to work with people for a social cause.

The first common platform of scientists was organised by working scientists of BARC in Mumbai. It was named the Federation of Indian Literary Scientists Association. They supported different groups of scientists in different language speaking states with science writings in the vernacular. In 1973 and 1978, regional conferences of scientists were organised in Bangalore and Thiruvananthapuram. As a result, organisations were formed in few other states also. By the 1970s, there was Assam Science Society in Assam, Bangiya Bijnan Parishad in West Bengal, Kerala Sastra Sahitya Parishad in Kerala and Karnataka Rajya Vijnan Parishad in Karnataka. The Bhopal Gas Tragedy of 1984 created a situation for these groups to work together against abuse of science and technology and lot of such activities were organised. In 1987, five national kala jathas were organised in the name Bharat Jan Vijnana Jatha which culminated in Bhopal. Following this, organisations sprouted in various states which created a conducive atmosphere for the establishment of the All India Peoples Science Network.

When All India Peoples Science Network was established in February 1988, there were 28 member organisations and presently, it has 35 members. It functions as a common platform for interaction on science and technology issues and learning. It organises All India Peoples Sciences Congress every two years to discuss various experiences in science and technology. The organisational conference of the network is held along with the congress.

== Members ==
Organization	Abbr.	Active zone
All India People's Science Network members
Assam Science Society	ASS	Assam
Bharat Gyan Vigyan Samiti	BGVS	Bihar
Bharat Gyan Vigyan Samithi	BGVS	Jharkhand
Bharat Gyan Vigyan Samiti	BGVS	Karnataka
Bharat Gyan Vigyan Samiti	BGVS	Madhya Pradesh
Bharat Gyan Vigyan Samiti	BGVS	Odisha
Bharat Gyan Vigyan Samiti	BGVS	Punjab
Bharat Gyan Vigyan Samiti	BGVS	Rajasthan
Bharat Gyan Vigyan Samiti	BGVS	Tripura
Bharat Gyan Vigyan Samiti	BGVS	Uttarakhand
Bharat Gyan Vigyan Samiti	BGVS	Uttar Pradesh
Bharat Gyan Vigyan Samuday	BGVS	Maharashtra
Centre for Technology & Development	CTD	Delhi
Chhattisgarh Vigyan Sabha	CGVS	Chhattisgarh
Delhi Science Forum	DSF	Delhi
Eklavya		Madhya Pradesh
Ellora Vigyan Manch		Assam
Federation of Medical Representatives Association of India	FMRAI	All-India
Forum of Scientists, Engineers and Technologists	FOSET	All-India
Gyan Vigyan Samiti		Assam
Gyan Vigyan Samiti		Haryana
Gyan Vigyan Samiti		Himachal Pradesh
Haryana Vigyan Manch		Haryana
Himachal Vigyan Manch		Himachal Pradesh
Jan Bigyan O Prajukti		Odisha
Jan Samwad Samiti		Uttarakhand
Jana Vigyan Vedika	JVV	Andhra Pradesh
Jana Vigyan Vedika	JVV	Telangana
Karnataka Rajya Vijnana Parishat	KRVP	Karnataka
Kerala Sasthra Sahithya Parishad	KSSP	Kerala
Madhya Pradesh Vigyan Sabha	MPVS	Madhya Pradesh
Navnirmiti		Maharashtra
National Confederation of Officers Association of Central Public Sector Undertaking	NCOA CPSU	All-India
Pondicherry Science Forum	PSF	Puducherry
Paschim Banga Vigyan Mancha	PBVM	West Bengal
Science for Society		Jharkhand
Society for Technology and Development	STD	Himachal Pradesh
Tamil Nadu Science Forum	TNSF	Tamil Nadu

== Major activities ==
1) Science Communication and Publication 2) Health 3) Education 4) Environment, Energy and Sustainable Development 5) Agriculture 6) Rural Technology 7) Decentralization 8) Samata 9) Cultural Communication

== See also ==
- Children's Indradanush
