= Centre for Ecology & Rural Development =

The Centre of Ecology & Rural Development (CERD) is an Indian organisation that is part of the Pondicherry Science Forum. It was formed to take up interventions in Health, Sanitation, Natural Resource Management, Energy, Watershed Management and Information Communication Technology.

CERD was set up in 1994 by the Pondicherry Science Forum and Tamil Nadu Science Forum to advance science and technology-based development initiatives improving rural livelihoods. Earlier works included interventions in sericulture, vegetable leather tanning, and fish aggregation devices.

CERD has a field station at Bahoor called the Kalanjiyam (granary in Tamil) that acts as a hub of agriculture and technology options for the surrounding area.

CERD has a full-time structure with a team of scientists working on areas including women's technology, science communication, continuing education, participatory irrigation management through local democratic people's institutions, women's microcredit networks etc.

The latest projects include the AICP Project on BIOFARM, a watershed development project in Sedappatti Block of Madurai funded by NABARD, and the Tank Rehabilitation Project-Pondicherry.

== Accomplishments/objectives ==
=== Soil fertility management ===
Research and development on Alternate Soil Fertility Management Strategies Systems for irrigated and dryland crops. Developed Decision Support System (DSS) for Soil Fertility Management.

=== Bioresource integrated farming ===
Reduction of external inputs, increasing internal resource flows in the farming system, and ensuring the nutritional security of the agricultural system.

=== Watershed development ===
Initiated programs in Madurai district. Participatory planning, implementation and management of the Watershed through people's organizations. Outlined the impacts of major watershed development programs in terms of biophysical impacts, environmental impacts, social-economic impacts and overall economic impacts.

=== Participatory irrigation management ===
Pilot work on irrigation tanks in Pondicherry. Evolved guidelines for sustainable institutional structures. Stakeholder participation was ensured including women and Dalits of landless communities. Large scale encroachment eviction through participatory approach leading to Participatory Irrigation Mgmt. Worked in low energy technologies for water system development (Oorani – drinking water pond) in Ramanathapuram

=== Wasteland reclamation ===
Evolved models for participatory wasteland reclamation through a coalition between landless Self-help Group (SHG) women and farmers' groups. Sustainable income for landless SHG women through collective farming.

=== ICT for rural development ===
Established the first successful model of Village Information Centre known as Samadhan Kendra through unique content creation in the local language. Software creation for local planning and primary production in local language including DSS.

=== Fuel-efficient stoves ===
CERD plans to expand its activities in this area by constructing more stoves and by expanding the works to areas such as Tamil Nadu. CERD construction of a fuel-efficient tawa for making dosa/parotta. Sought subsidies from the Renewable Energy Agency for the Tawa stove.

=== Biomass-based biogas units ===
With technical collaboration from IISc. Bangalore, CERD planned to construct biogas units. The units are based on biomass decomposition and tapping the biogas for cooking purposes.

=== Organic farming ===
Formed an Organic Farmers' Association CERD plans to extend support to this network, including establishing organic certification processes for farmers and for arranging marketing linkages for their produce. Backward and forward links connect seeds, plant protection, harvest and post-harvest options.

=== Nutrition-based kitchen gardening systems ===
This is women-focused, especially for women under SHGs since malnutrition levels in Pondicherry women approach 80%. This programme plans to provide complete backward and forward linkages from seeds, bio-manures, biopesticides, processing, and marketing.

=== Micro-enterprises ===
CERD plans to support viable village-level enterprises for improved livelihood options for women, Dalits and other weaker sections with providing necessary science and technology inputs and data processing skills.
