= M. K. Prasad =

Indian environmentalist (1932–2022)

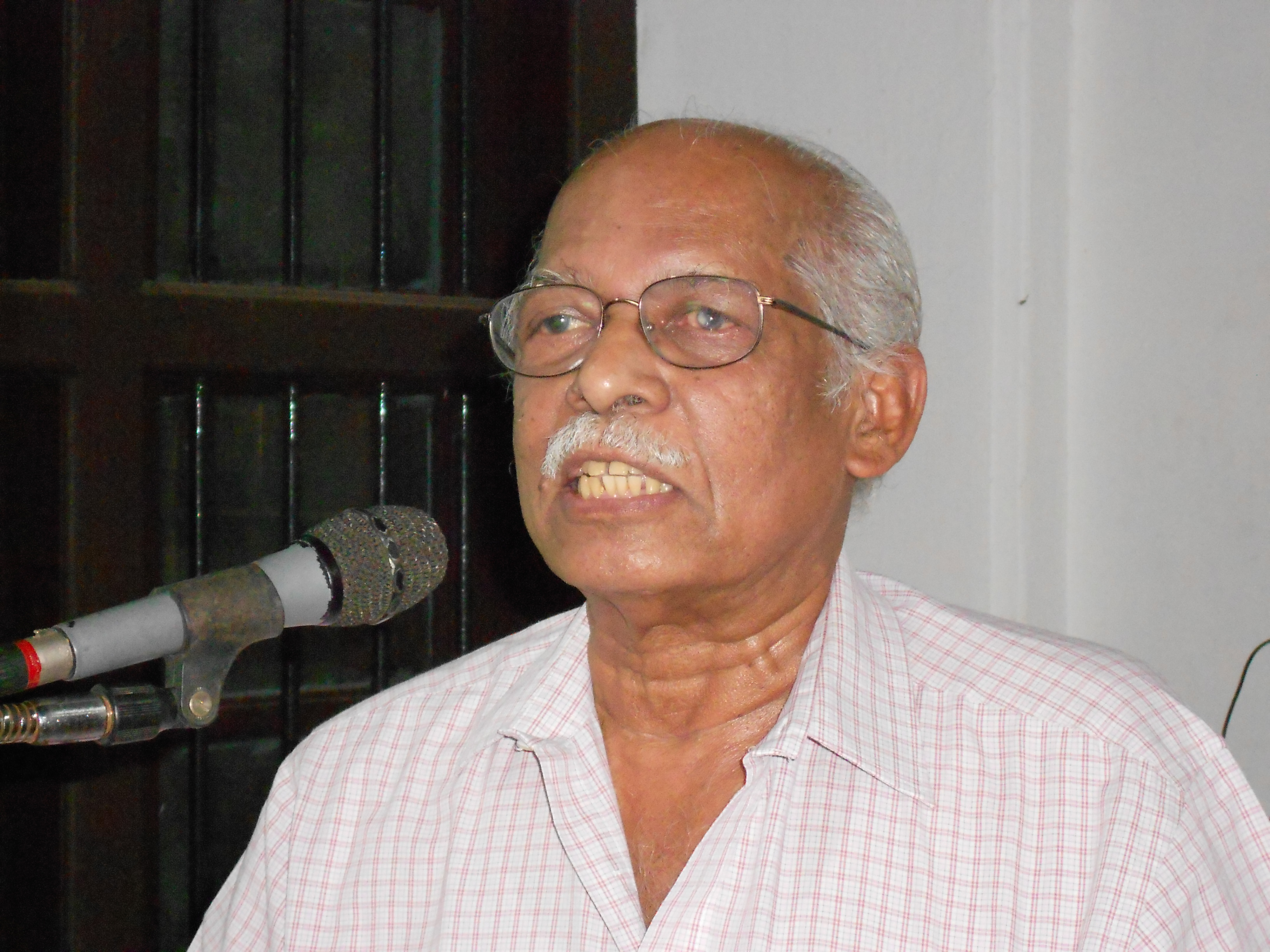
- Born: 1932; Kochi, Kerala, British Raj
- Died: 17 January 2022 (age 89–90); Kochi, Kerala, India
- Scientific career
- Fields: environment, nature, biodiversity

M. K. Prasad (1932 – 17 January 2022) (Note: There is some confusion about Prasad's date of birth. Most sources indicate that Prasad was born in 1932. However, Samayam, a Malayalam language newspaper, states his date of birth as 24 January 1933.) was an Indian environmentalist known for his grassroots level activism to protect tropical rainforests in the Indian state of Kerala. In the late 1970s, as a member of Kerala Sasthra Sahithya Parishad, he led the Save Silent Valley movement, to prevent development of a hydroelectric project in the Silent Valley National Park, a project that would have flooded the rainforest.

He was a principal of the Maharaja’s College Ernakulam, Kochi, and pro vice chancellor of Calicut University. Earlier, as a part of KSSP, he had contributed to the national literacy mission which had resulted in his native Ernakulam district being declared the first fully literate district in the country.

== Early life ==
Prasad was born in an Ezhava family in Cherai on the island of Vypin in the coastal district of Ernakulam in present day Indian state of Kerala. He studied in the Rama Varuna Union High School, a school that was established by local Hindu and Christian community leaders. The headmaster of the school and Prasad's early mentor, K. C. Abraham, would later go on to serve as the governor of Gujarat. While his family was expecting him to follow in his uncle's footsteps to become an Ayurveda physician, he joined Maharaja's College in Kochi. He received an undergraduate degree in botany before going to Birla Institute of Technology and Science, Pilani to graduate with a master's degree in botany.

== Career and activism ==
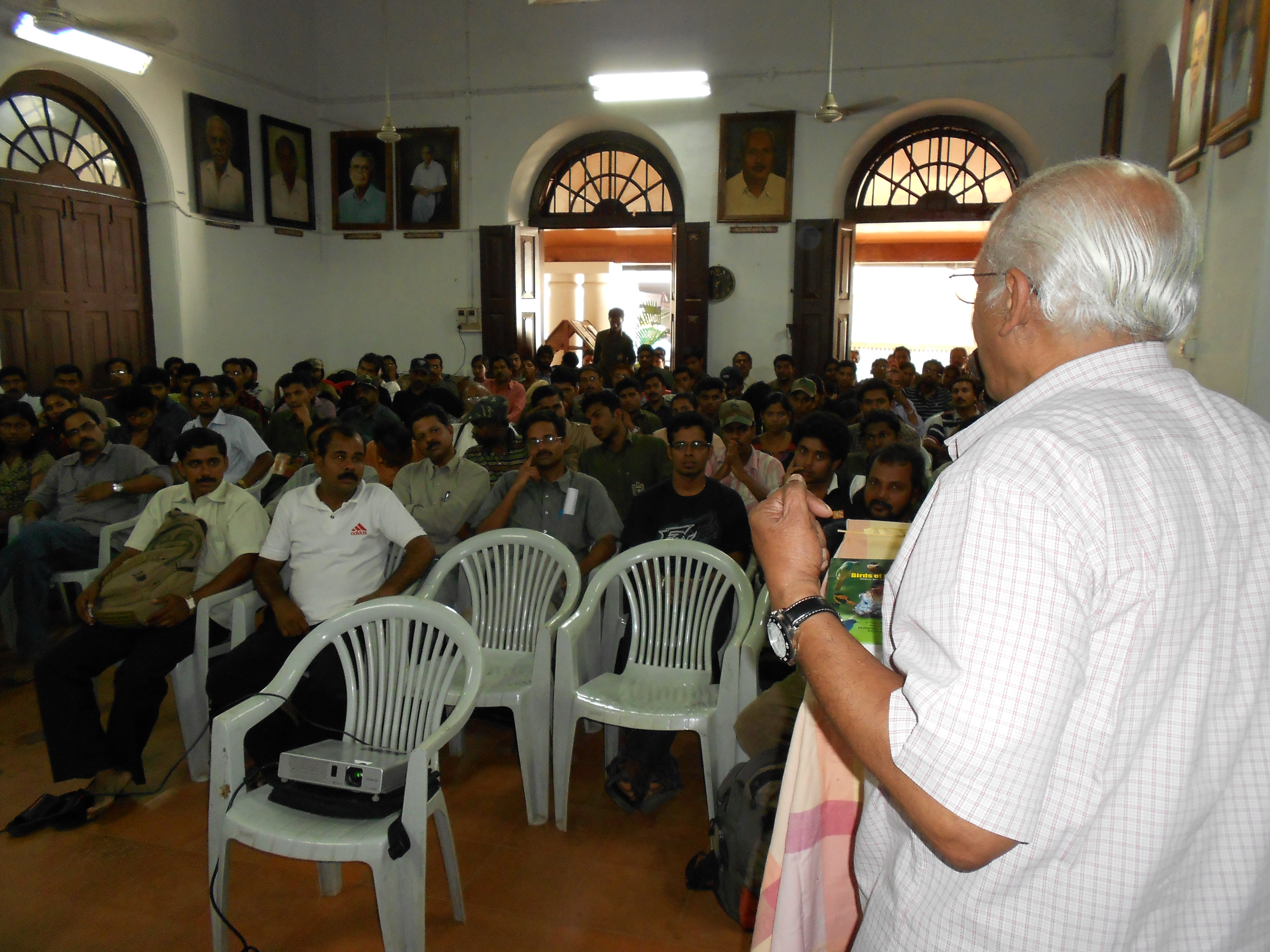
Prof. M. K. Prasad speaks at an ornithologist meeting, Kerala Sahitya academy hall, Thrissur in connection with the National Book Festival

Prasad joined the Kerala State Educational Service in 1955 and went on to spend over 30 years in the academic arena holding various positions in the Kerala higher education system including Principal of the Maharaja’s College Ernakulam, Kochi and Pro Vice Chancellor of Calicut University.

Prasad joined the Kerala Sasthra Sahithya Parishad (KSSP, transl. Kerala Science Literature Council) in 1967. The organization was set up in 1962 as a publishing house focusing on publishing scientific magazines and journals. He wrote extensively for the organization's science journals before stepping in to set up the Ernakulam district unit for the organization. Some of the topics that he wrote in the initial years in the 1960s included industrial pollution, particularly focusing on the estuaries of the Periyar river. In 1971, he partnered with scientists Syed Zahoor Qasim and U. K. Gopalan to organize a seminar and draw attention to the problems of industrial pollution in the Ernakulam district.

In the late 1970s, he led efforts to save the Silent Valley, a tropical rain forest in the Western ghats in southern India, when a planned hydroelectric plant threatened to flood and devastate the flora and fauna of Silent Valley. He initially wrote about the project's impacts in Sastragathi, a scientific journal published by KSSP, in 1977. He later led efforts, working with engineers, economists, and scientists, to draw attention to the environmental impact of the project. These efforts were followed by ground level activism including organization of street plays and other forms of protest across the state. The protests were called off in the early 1980s when the then prime minister Indira Gandhi, ceding to the protests, promised that the forests would be preserved.

Prasad also contributed to efforts at KSSP towards the spread of literacy as a part of the national literacy mission. He was actively engaged in actions that resulted in Ernakulam being declared the first fully literate district in India in 1990. He also set up KSSP’s Integrated Rural technology Centre in Mundur, Palakkad district, Kerala and served as the centre's director for three years.

Prasad was a member of the United Nations’ Millennium Ecosystem Assessment Board for a five-year tenure. He was also a life member and active participant in the activities of the World Wide Fund of Nature (WWF) – India and of the International Union for Conservation of Nature (IUCN-CEC). In India, he chaired the Programme Advisory Committee of the MS Swaminathan Research Foundation's (MSSRF) Agro Biodiversity Centre, in Wayanad, Kerala and served as a member of the Governing Council of the Centre for Environment Education (CEE) and of the Kerala State Biodiversity Board.

He authored numerous books and monographs in Malayalam on environmental issues and popular science and co-authored a techno-economic and socio-political assessment of the Silent Valley Hydro Electric project in 1979.

Prasad also served as the vice chancellor of the University of Calicut, the principal of the Maharaja's College, Ernakulam, the executive vice chairman of the Kerala Government's Information Kerala Mission, and the president of the KSSP.

== Personal life ==
Prasad was married to Sherly Prasad, who retired as a professor from Maharaja's College, Ernakulam. The couple had two children, a son and a daughter. He was a native of Kochi.

Prasad died at a private hospital in Kochi on 17 January 2022, while being treated for complications of COVID-19.

== See also ==
- Save Silent Valley
- Sugathakumari
