= Thulir =

Thulir is an Indian monthly children's science magazine published in Tamil by the Pondicherry Science Forum and Tamil Nadu Science Forum without a break since 1987. Its purpose is to bring science to school children, especially in rural areas. The headquarters of the monthly is in Chennai. Thulir is sustained by the support of children and teachers.
