= Avittathur Mahadeva Temple =

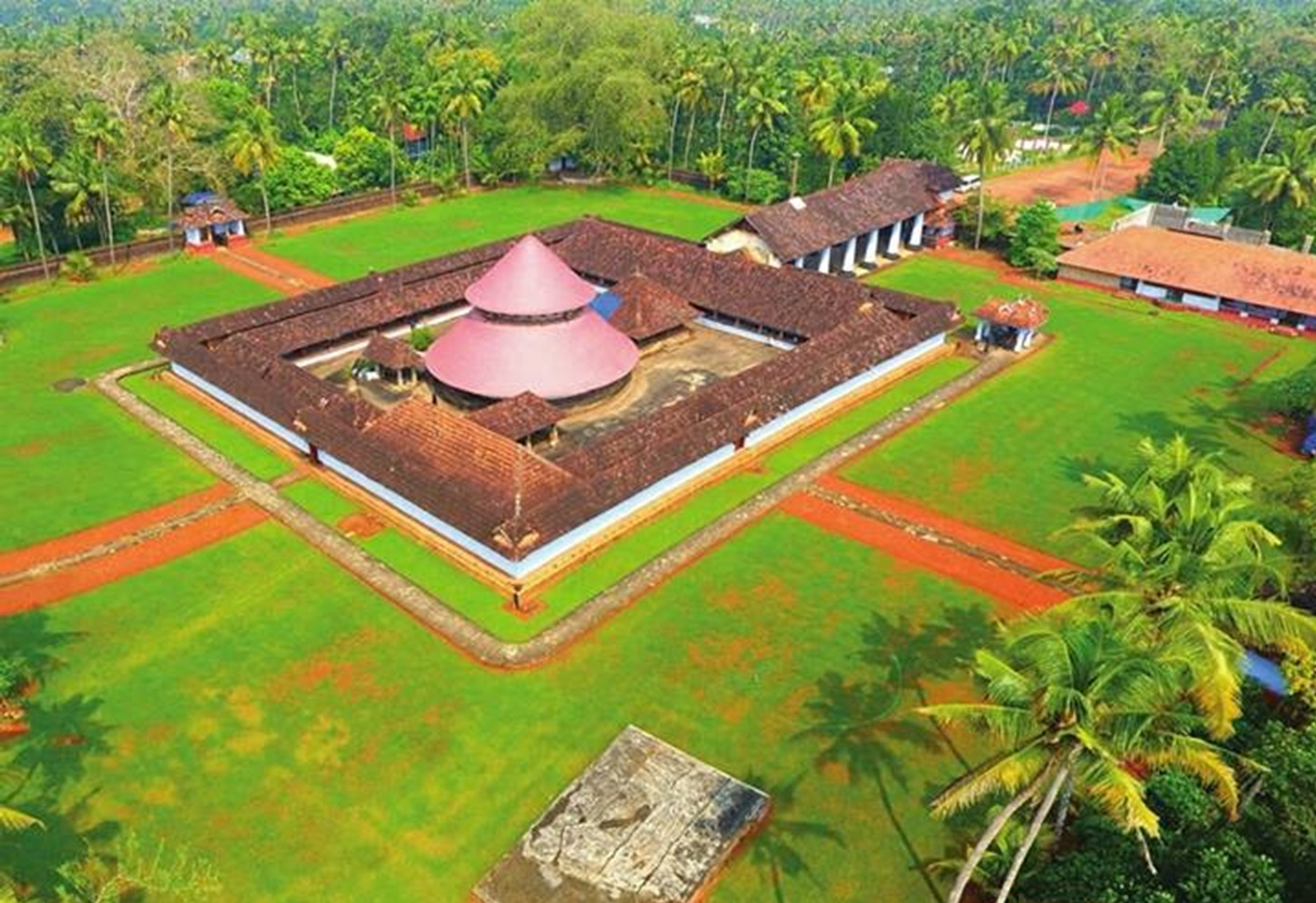
- Temple Aerial view

- Mahadeva Temple, Avittathur, Thrissur, Kerala

Religion
- Affiliation: Hinduism
- District: Thrissur
- Deity: Kiratha murthy, Krishna
- Festivals: Maha Shivaratri, Utsav in Dhanu

Location
- Location: Avittathur
- State: Kerala
- Country: India
- Interactive map of Avittathur Mahadeva Temple
- Coordinates: 10°20′06″N 76°14′43″E

Architecture
- Type: Kerala style
- Completed: more than 2000 years

Specifications
- Temple: One
- Elevation: 42.17 m (138 ft)

Website
- http://www.avittathursiva.com

Avittathur Mahadeva Temple, an ancient Hindu temple dedicated to Lord Shiva is situated at Avittathur village of Thrissur District in Kerala state in India. Avittathur gramam (village) is one of the 64 original Brahmin settlements in the ancient Kerala. The Avittathur temple as well as Avittathur Gramam is equally famous like Thaliparamb gramam, Sukapuram gramam, Irinjalakuda gramam and Peruvanam gramam. Avittathur Mahadeva Temple is more than 2000 years old and four old inscriptions have been discovered. According to folklore, sage Agastya has installed the idol of Lord Shiva. It is also believed that the temple's shiva lingam was installed by lord Parasurama the sixth incarnation of Lord Maha Vishnu. The temple is a part of the famous 108 Shiva temples of Kerala.

== Temple Structure ==
The temple compound is 3.25 acres; Sri Mahadeva (Lord Shiva) facing west in a separate Sanctum Sanctorum. The temple complex is very huge and is preserved as a national monument by ASI (Archaeological Survey of India). The temple having a compound wall in square shape. The Avittathur Mahadeva Temple is a class of its own beauty. The temple sanctum sanctorum is round shaped with copper tiled double storey. Ambalavattam (Nalambalam) is majestic in shape and the extensive Nadapura (Anakottil) at west side having huge pillars as its support while the valia-balikkal near the inner entrance is large enough to hide the direct view of the sanctum sanctorum. Daily poojas are performing as per the requirements of a "Maha kshetra".

== Ancient Village Avittathur ==
Avittathur is one of the 64 original Brahmin settlement in the Kerala state. The temple was owned by 28 Brahmin families in the village of Avittathur. It is said that Shiva Lingam of temple installed by lord parasurama and later sage Agasthya was constructed temple and designed the day-to-day rituals of the temple. The name of the village was originally agastyaputtur but it seems to be just the Sanskritization of the word.

== Avittathur Inscriptions ==
The Avittathur inscription (AD 1024) is in the period of Chera King of Mahodayapuram (Kodungallur) Raja Kulasekhara Kota Ravi Varman (Ravi Kota "Rajasimha" (c. 1021– c.1036 CE)). Inscription says about the conditions of Chirakkal Nilam (Chirakkal paddy fields) at Avittathur; It was handed over to Avittathur Mahadeva Temple for the day-to-day expenditure of temple. The rules (inscription) named "Kadakottu Kacham". Avittathur inscription discovered at Avittathur Thazhekad Church near to the Avittathur Mahadeva temple. The Kadankattu kacham is similar to the Moozhikulam kacham of Thirumoozhikkulam Lakshmana Perumal Temple. In addition to that four more old inscriptions have been discovered in the temple compound.

== See also ==
- 108 Shiva Temples
- Temples of Kerala
- Avittathur Script

== Temple Photos ==
Avittathur Mahadeva Temple

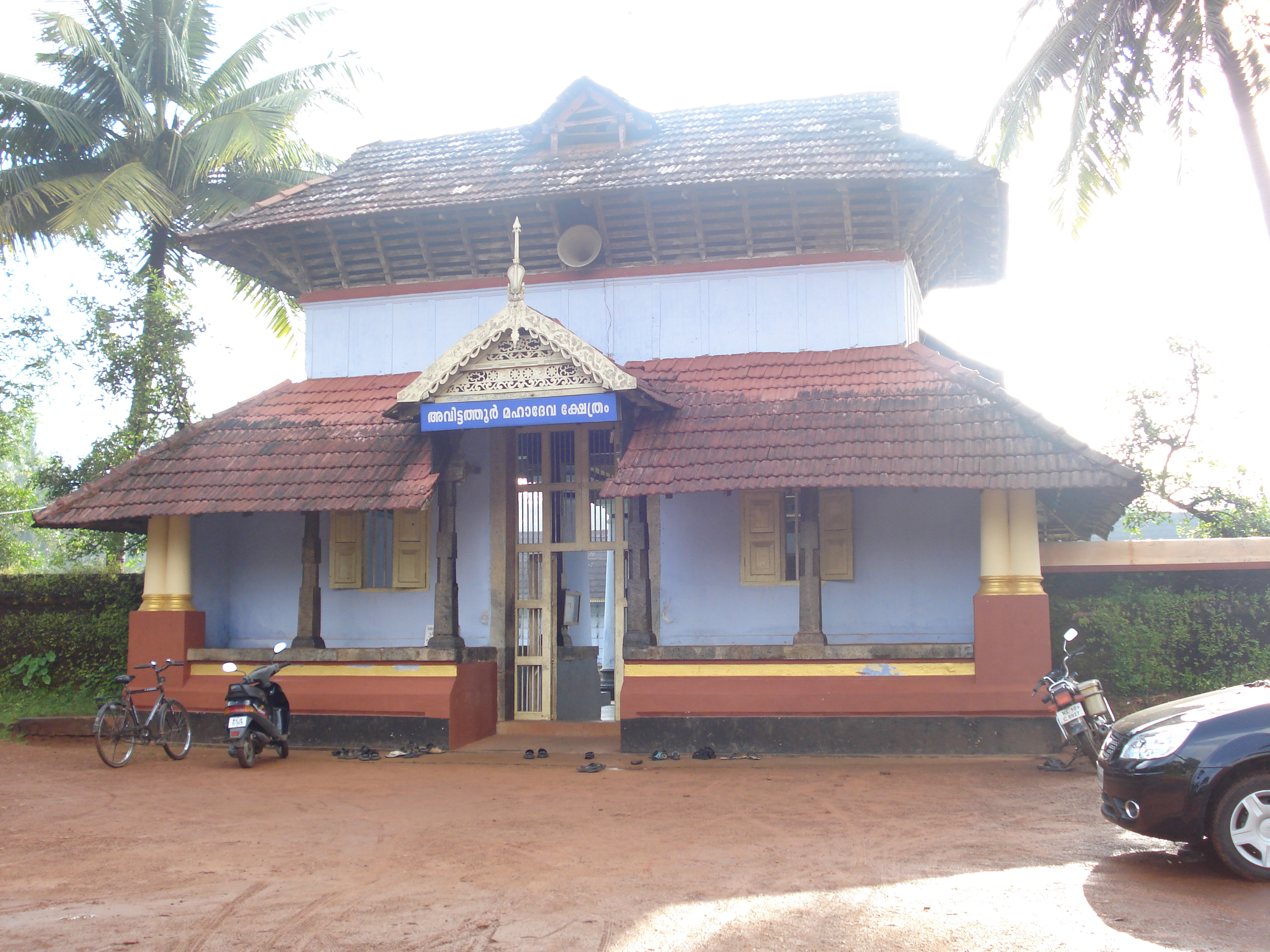
Temple East Tower

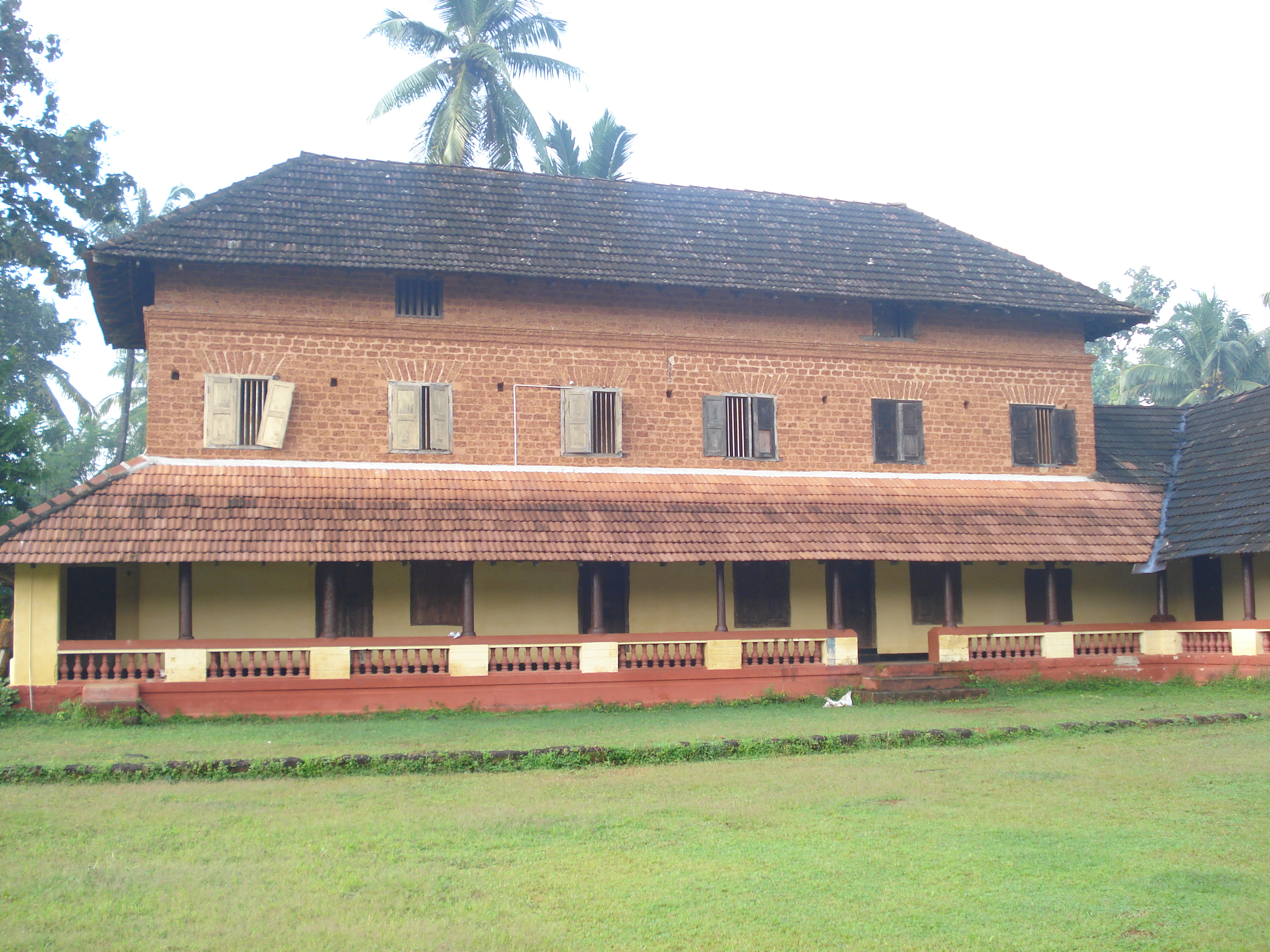
Oottupura

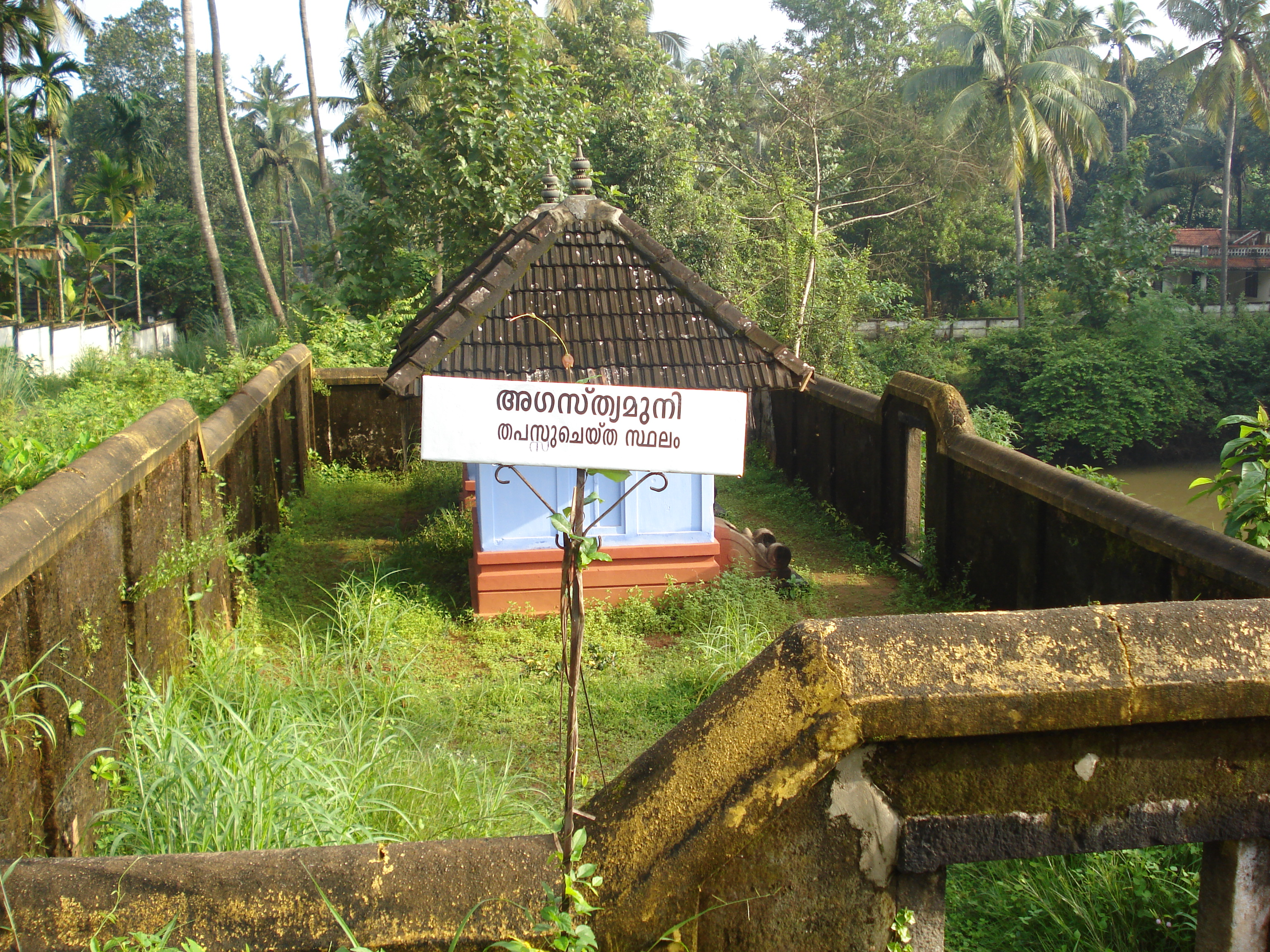
Sage Agasta Temple

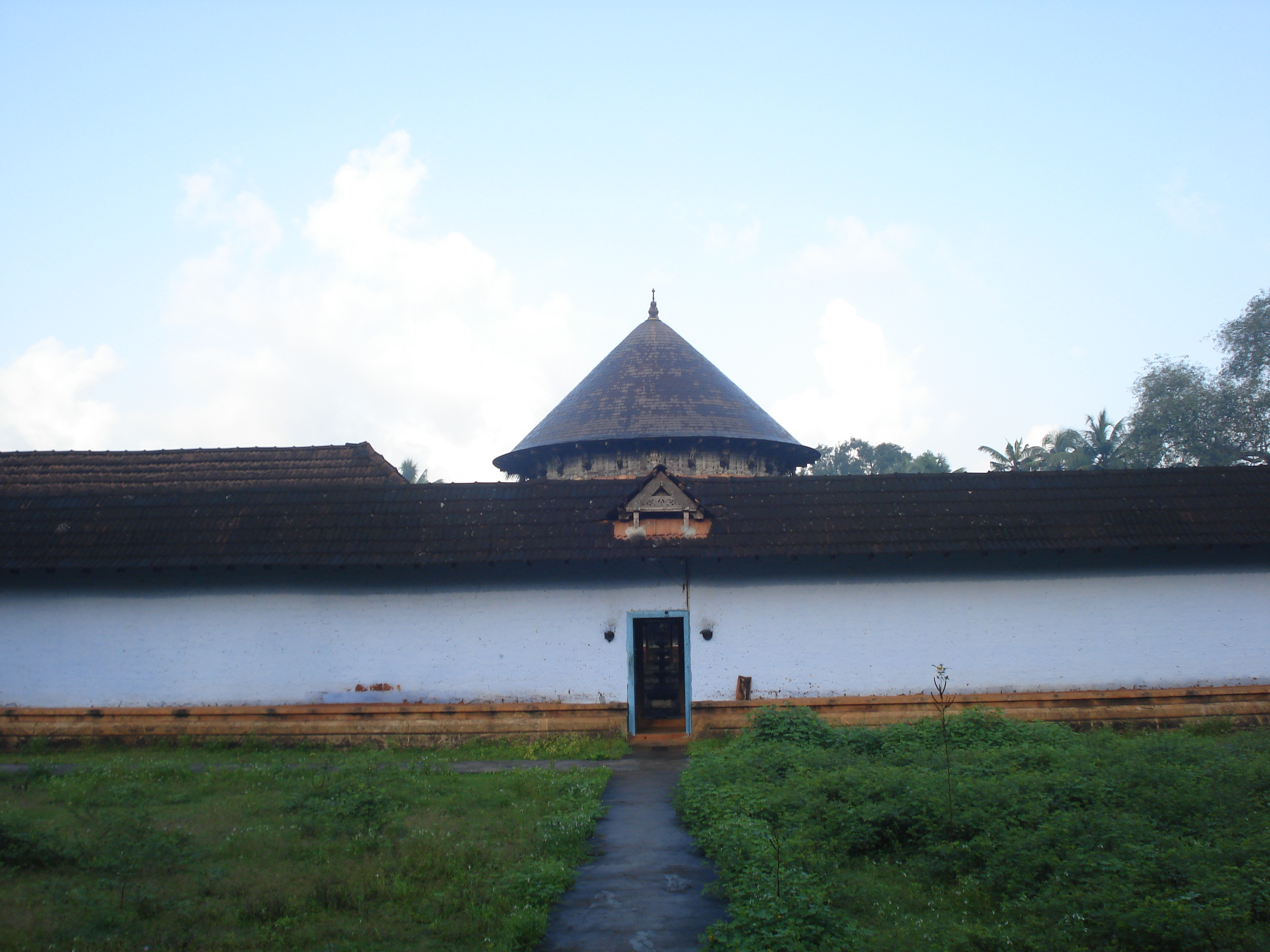
Nalambalam

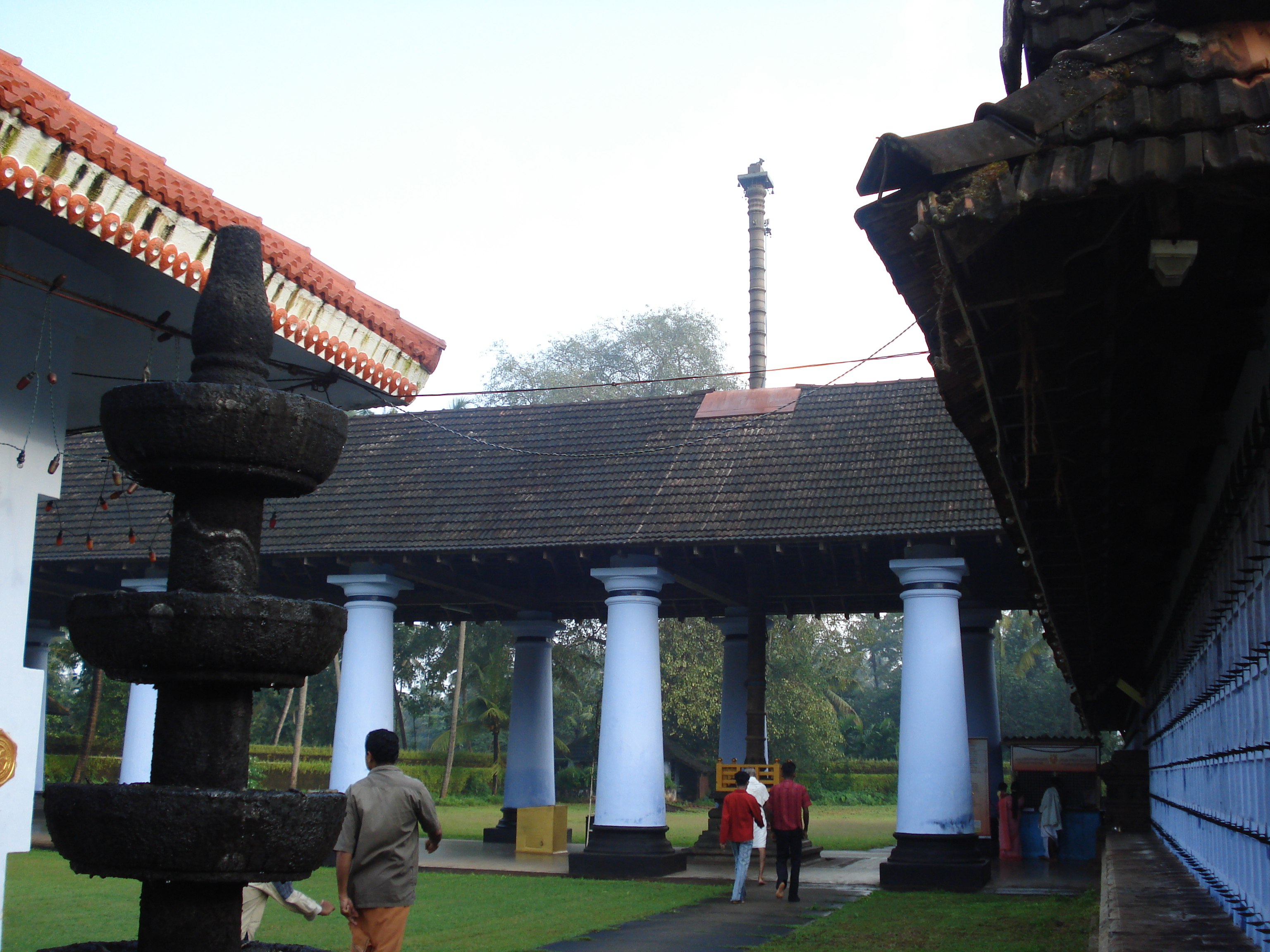
West Nadapura
