= Dilip K. Biswas =

Indian environmentalist

- Born: India
- Occupation: Environmentalist
- Known for: Pollution control
- Awards: Padma Shri

Dilip K. Biswas is an Indian environmentalist and former chairman of the Central Pollution Control Board and Delhi Pollution Control Committee.

== Career ==
He was a member of the panel which conducted ecological studies on Silent Valley and checked the feasibility of a hydro-electric project in the area, eventually recommending against project, leading to the declaration of Silent Valley as a National Park. He is the author of Implementation of the Clean Development Mechanism in Asia and the Pacific: Issues, Challenges, and Opportunities, a report published by the United Nations as a guideline for the implementation of the Clean Development Mechanism (CDM), prescribed by Kyoto Protocol. His contributions are also reported behind the drafting of the environment management laws in Lucknow, the capital city of the Indian state of Uttar Pradesh. The Government of India awarded him the fourth highest civilian honour of the Padma Shri, in 2007, for his contributions to science and technology.

== See also ==
- Clean Development Mechanism
- Kyoto Protocol
- Save Silent Valley
