= Sathya Vageeswarar Temple, Kalakkad =

Shiva temple in Tamil Nadu, India

Sathya Vageeswarar Temple
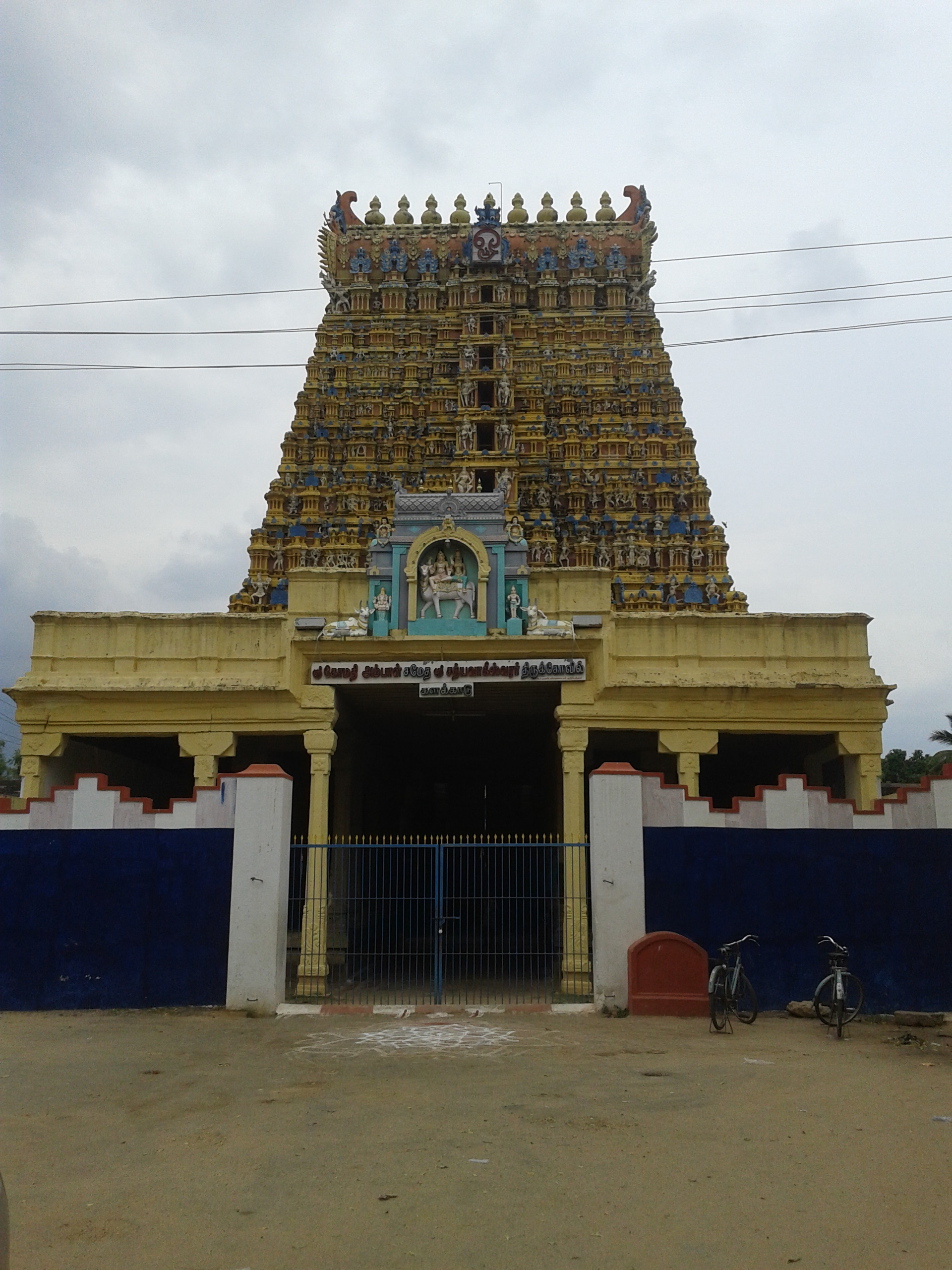

- Location in Tamil Nadu

Religion
- Affiliation: Hinduism
- District: Tirunelveli
- Deity: Sathya Vageeswarar(Shiva) Gomathi (Parvathi)

Location
- Location: Kalakkad
- State: Tamil Nadu
- Country: India
- Coordinates: 8°30′59″N 77°33′00″E

Architecture
- Type: Dravidian architecture

Sathya Vageeswarar Temple in Kalakkad, a village in Tirunelveli district in the South Indian state of Tamil Nadu, is dedicated to the Hindu god Shiva. This Temple is Centered on Kalakad Town, It is located 45 km from Tirunelveli. Constructed in the Dravidian style of architecture, the temple has three precincts. Shiva is worshipped as Sathya Vageeswarar and his consort Parvathi as Gomathi.

A granite wall surrounds the temple, enclosing all its shrines. The temple has a 135 ft (41 m) gateway tower containing 1,500 stucco images. The temple was originally built by Pandyas during the 13th century and Nayak kings commissioned pillared halls and major shrines of the temple during the 15-16th century. The temple has artistic sculptures representative of Nayak art. The temple has close to 200 paintings in the temple depicting Indian epic tales. The temple also has a granary made of masonry, which is believed to be commissioned during the 13th century. There is a hall of musical pillars, commissioned by the king of Travancore, Boothala Veera Udaya Marthanda Varman during the 16th century.

The temple is open from 6 am - 10.30 am and 5.30pm-8 pm on all days except during festival days when it is open the full day. Four daily rituals and three yearly festivals are held at the temple, of which the Vaikasi Visakam festival during the Tamil month of Vaikasi (May - June) being the most prominent. The temple is maintained and administered by the Hindu Religious and Endowment Board of the Government of Tamil Nadu.

== Vaippu Sthalam ==
It is one of the shrines of the Vaippu Sthalams sung by Tamil Saivite Nayanar Appar.

== History ==
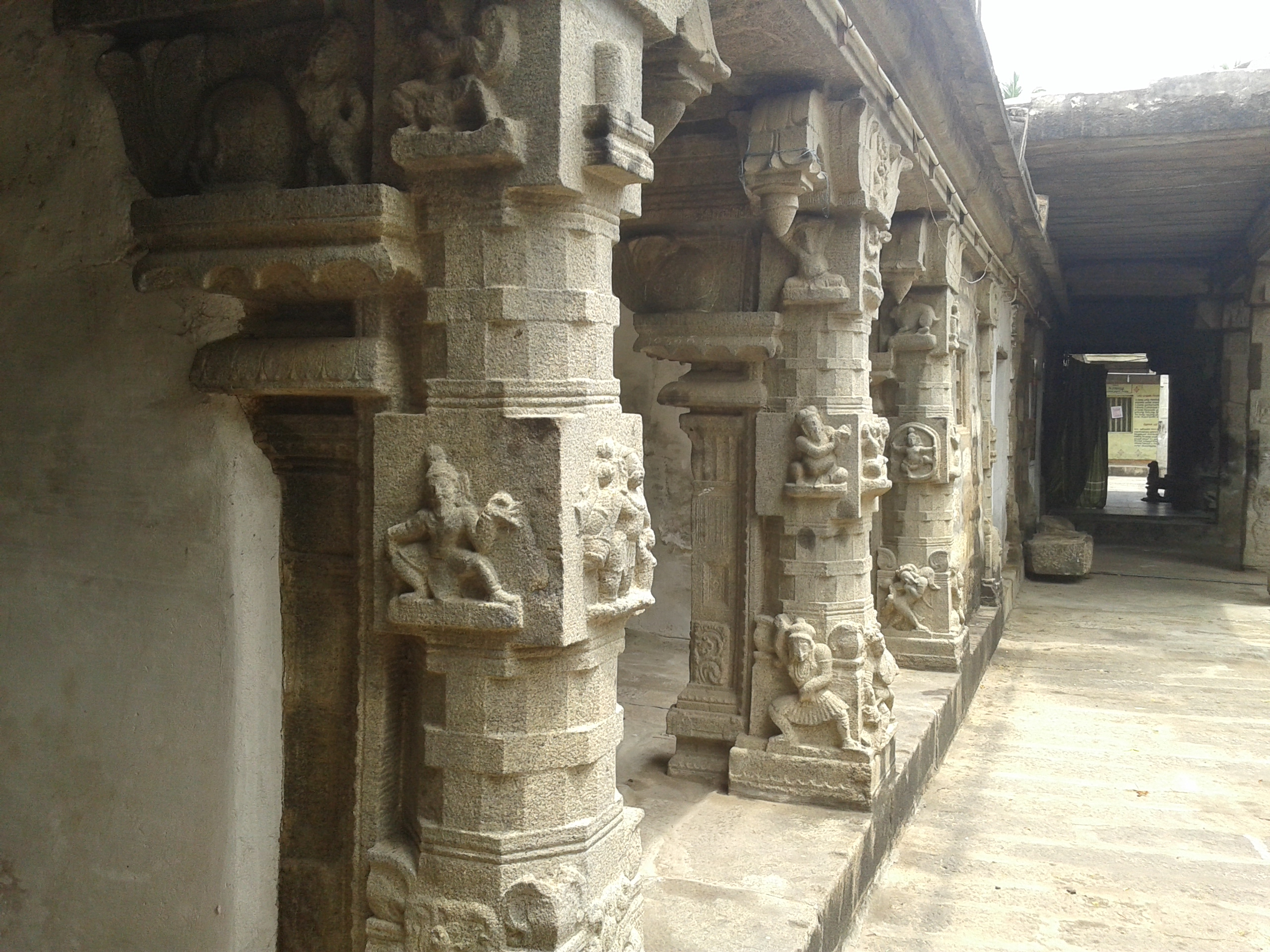
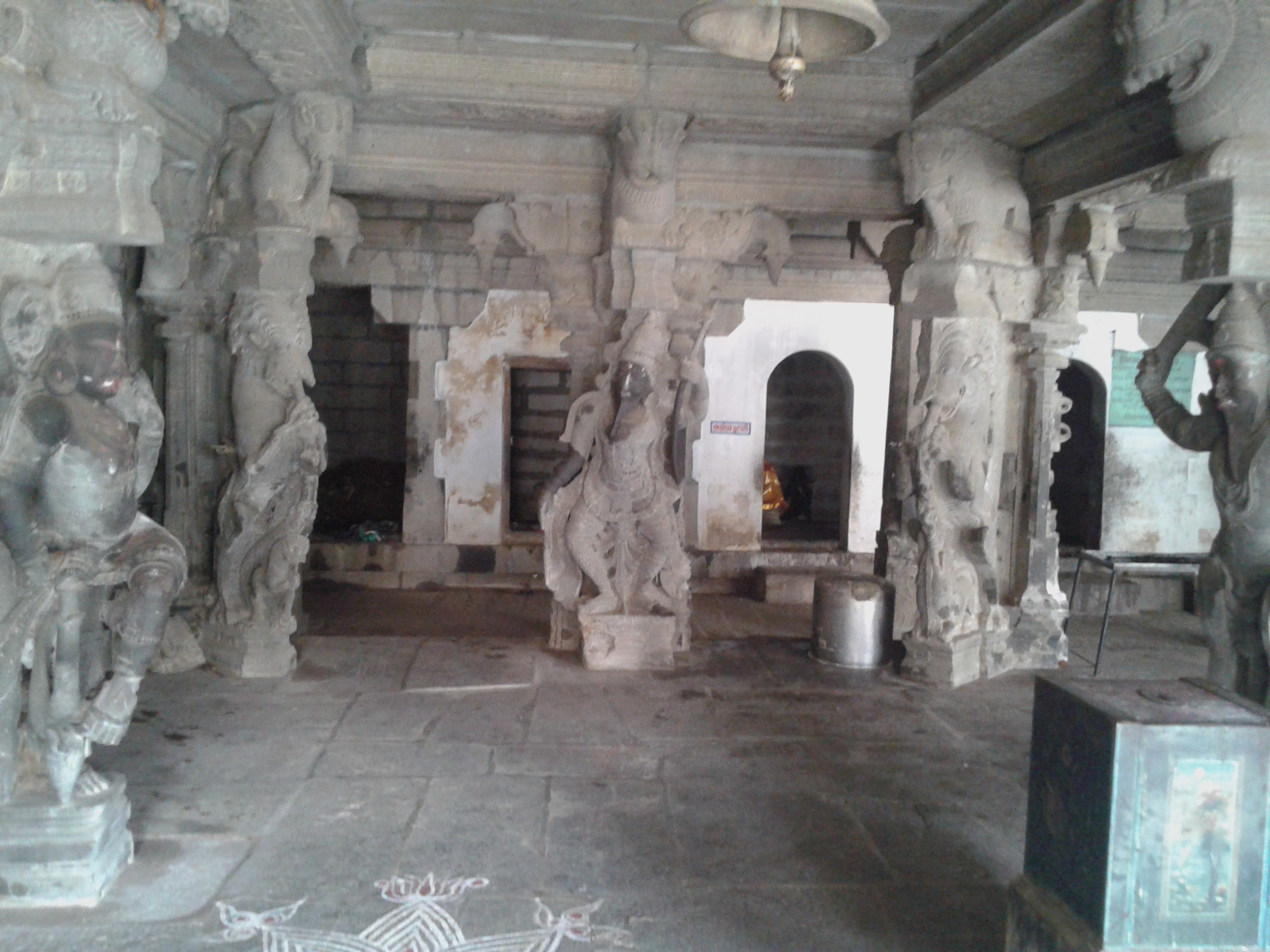
Sculpted pillared halls inside the temple

Inscriptions from the temple from the 15th century indicate that the place was called Cholanadu Vallipuram and Vanavan Naadu. The inscriptions also indicate that the temple worship services and gifts to the temple were endowed by Marthanda Varman, while he was residing at Virapandiyan Palace. The temple was originally built by Pandyas during the 13th century. The Vijayanagar Empire and Nayak kings commissioned pillared halls and major shrines of the temple during the 15-16th century. The temple has artistic sculptures representative of Nayak art. There are lot of paintings in the temple depicting Indian epic tales. There is also an image of the king of Travancore, Boothala Veera Udaya Marthanda Varman from the 16th century. He is believed to have commissioned the musical pillared halls in the front portion of the temple. In modern times, the temple is maintained and administered by the Hindu Religious and Endowment Board of the Government of Tamil Nadu. A plaque in front the temple installed on 12 December 1911 indicates the coronation of king George V, when India was ruled by the British.

== Architecture ==
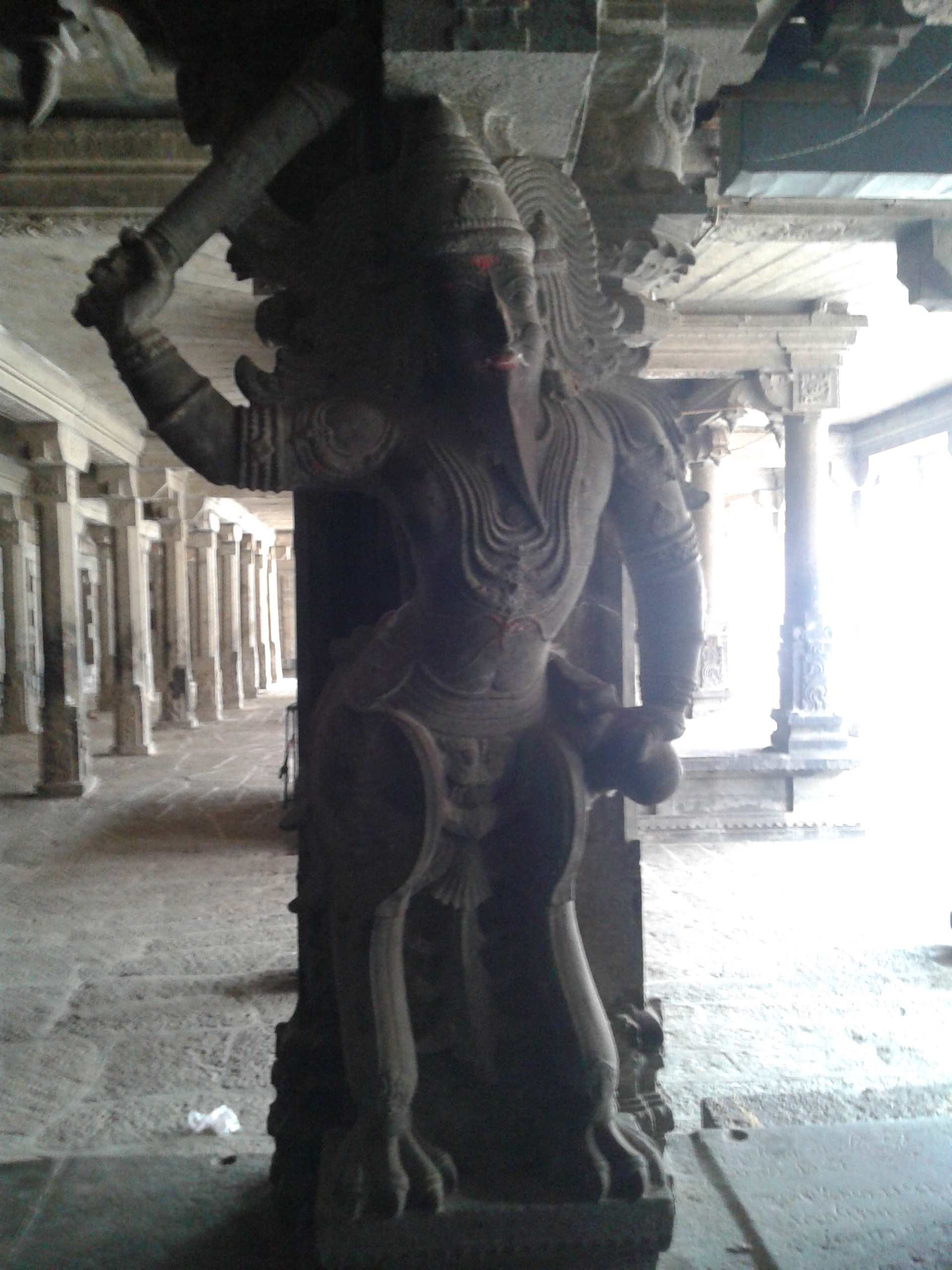
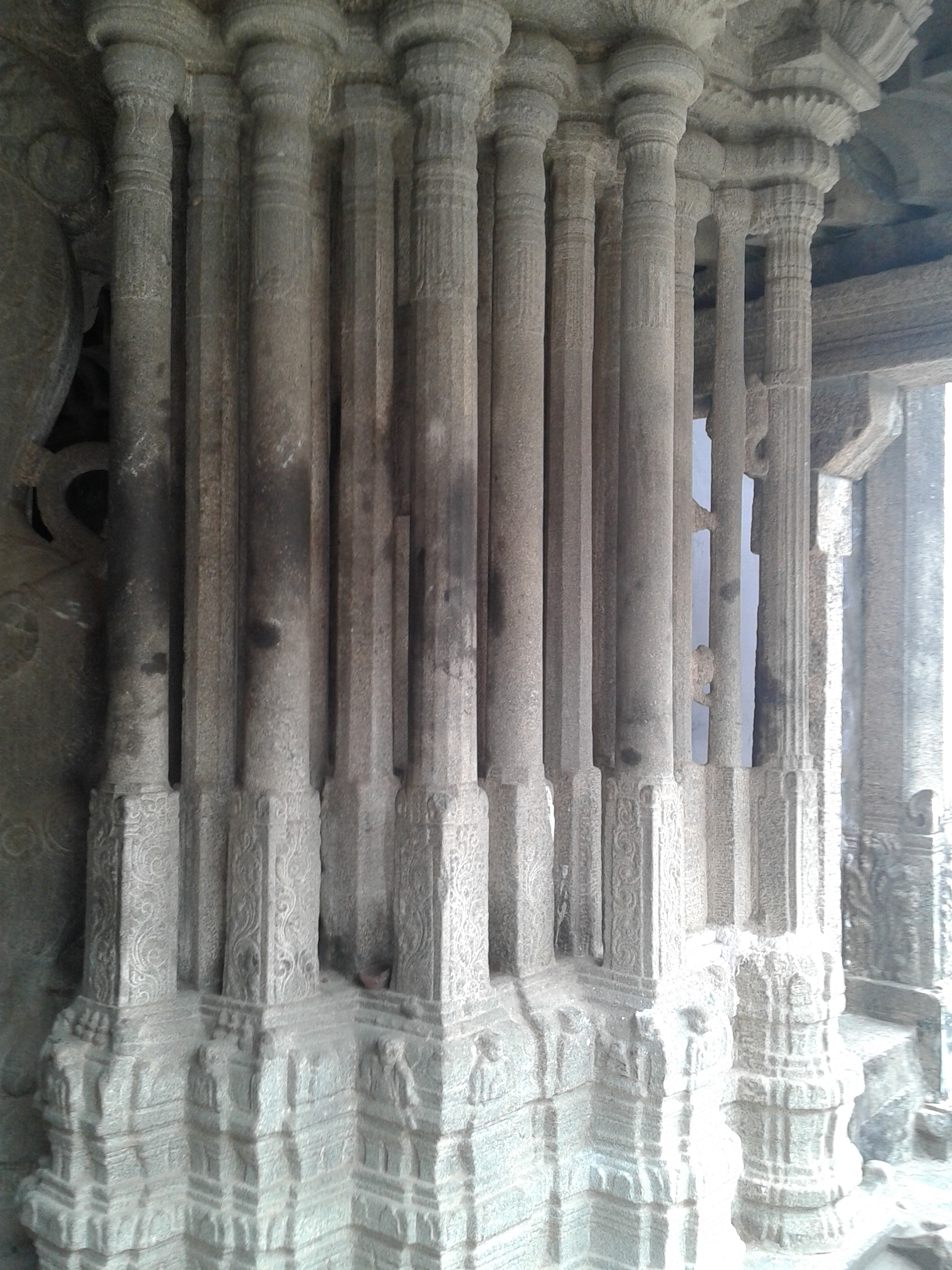
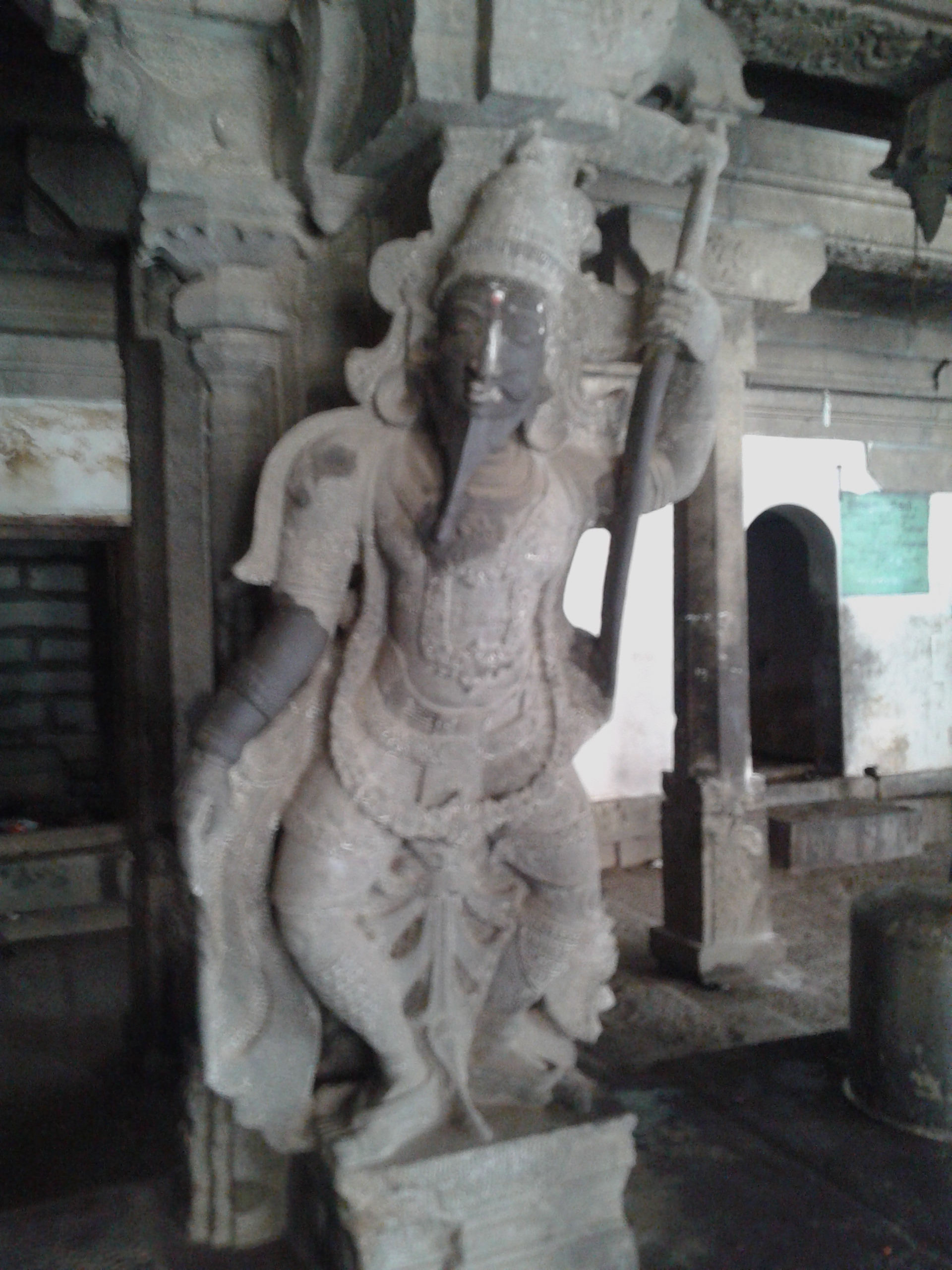
Sculpted pillars

A granite wall surrounds the temple, enclosing all its shrines and bodies of water. The temple has a nine-tiered 135 ft (41 m) gateway tower containing 1,500 stucco images in the outside, while there are 200 murals from the inside. The nine tiers can be climbed through a flight of steps inside the tower. The image of Sathya Vageeswarar in the form of Lingam is housed in the sanctum. The shrine of his consort is housed in a west facing shrine. The sanctum is approached from the gateway through a flag staff hall, a Mahamandap and an Artha mandap. There are shrines of Vinayaka and Subramanya on the Mahamandap. The first precinct around the sanctum has images of Dakshinamurthy, Vishnu, Durga, Chandikeswara and Navagrahas. The flagstaff hall has a flagstaff, an altar and an image of Nandi, all axial to the sanctum and the gateway tower. There are also halls in the temple having yali pillared halls, atypical of Nayak art. The temple also has a granary made of masonry, which is believed to be commissioned during the 13th century. It is unique that usually temple granaries are made of wood.

The stucco images depict various mythical themes related to Shiva. The murals depict stories from epics like Ramayana and Mahabharata and also Thiruvilayadal, the divine plays, Shiva's marriage to Parvathi, stories of Saivite saints and wedding of Sundarar. The paintings and stucco images were restored during 2008 when non-governmental organizations rebuilt the plasters with vegetable colours and natural ingredients. Historians believe that the paintings have a modern look and depicts the contemporary style of dress and ornaments worn during the period.

== Festival ==
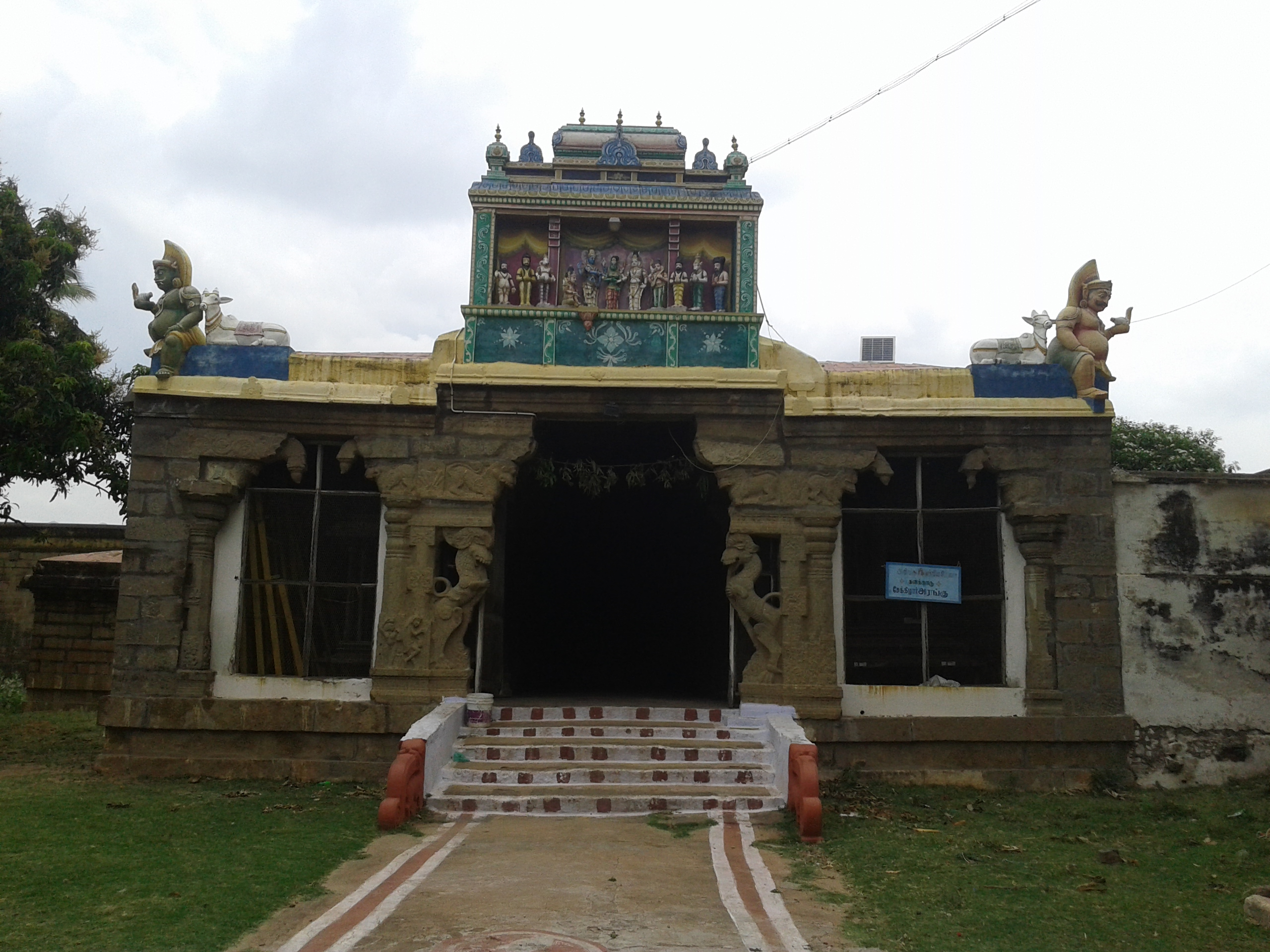
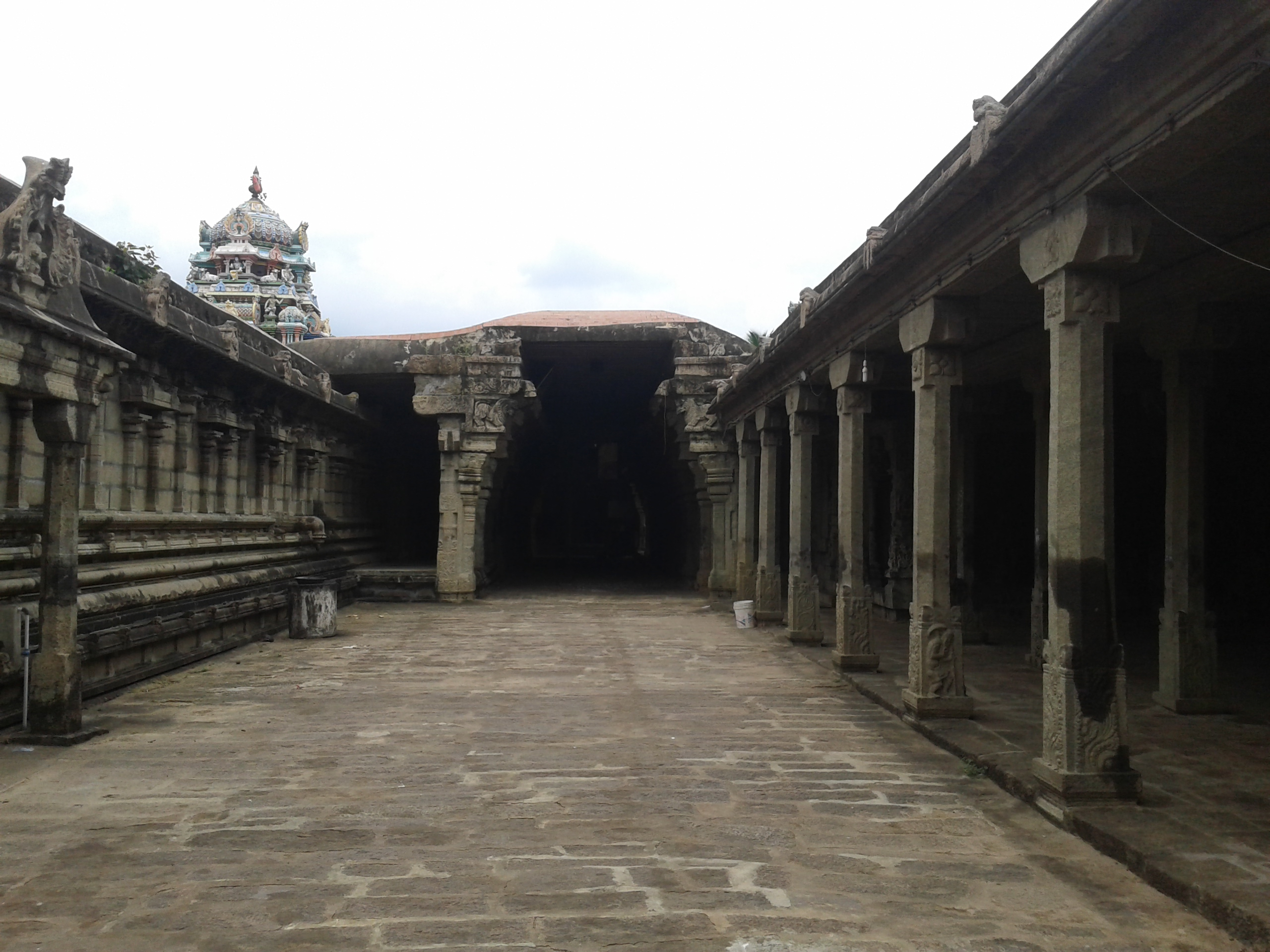
Halls inside the temple

The temple follows Saivite tradition. The temple priests perform the pooja (rituals) during festivals and on a daily basis. As at other Shiva temples of Tamil Nadu, the priests belong to the Shaivite community, a Brahmin sub-caste. The temple rituals are performed four times a day: Kalasanthi at 8:30 a.m., Uchikalam at 11:30 p.m., Sayarakshai at 6:00 p.m., and Sayarakshai between 8:00 - 8:00 p.m. Each ritual has three steps: alangaram (decoration), neivethanam (food offering) and deepa aradanai (waving of lamps) for both Sathya Vageeswarar and Gomathi. There are weekly, monthly and fortnightly rituals performed in the temple. The temple is open from 6am - 12 pm and 4-8:30 pm on all days except during new moon days when it is open the full day. The Vaikasi Visakam festival during the Tamil month of Vaikasi (May - June) being the most prominent. During the festival, the temple chariot is drawn around the streets of Kalakkad, with the festival images of Sathya Vageeswar and Gomathi housed in it. Other festivals like Sivarathri, Thirukalyanam (sacred marriage) and Kanthasasthi are also celebrated.
