= Save Silent Valley =

Ecology protection movement in Kerala, India

Silent Valley movement was a social movement aimed at the protection of Silent Valley, an evergreen sub-tropical forest in the Palakkad district of Kerala, India. It was started in 1966 by an NGO led by Kerala Sasthra Sahithya Parishad (KSSP) to save the Silent Valley from being flooded by a hydroelectric project. In February 1973, the Planning Commission approved the project at a cost of about Rs. 25 crores. The valley was declared as Silent Valley National Park in 1985.

== Background ==
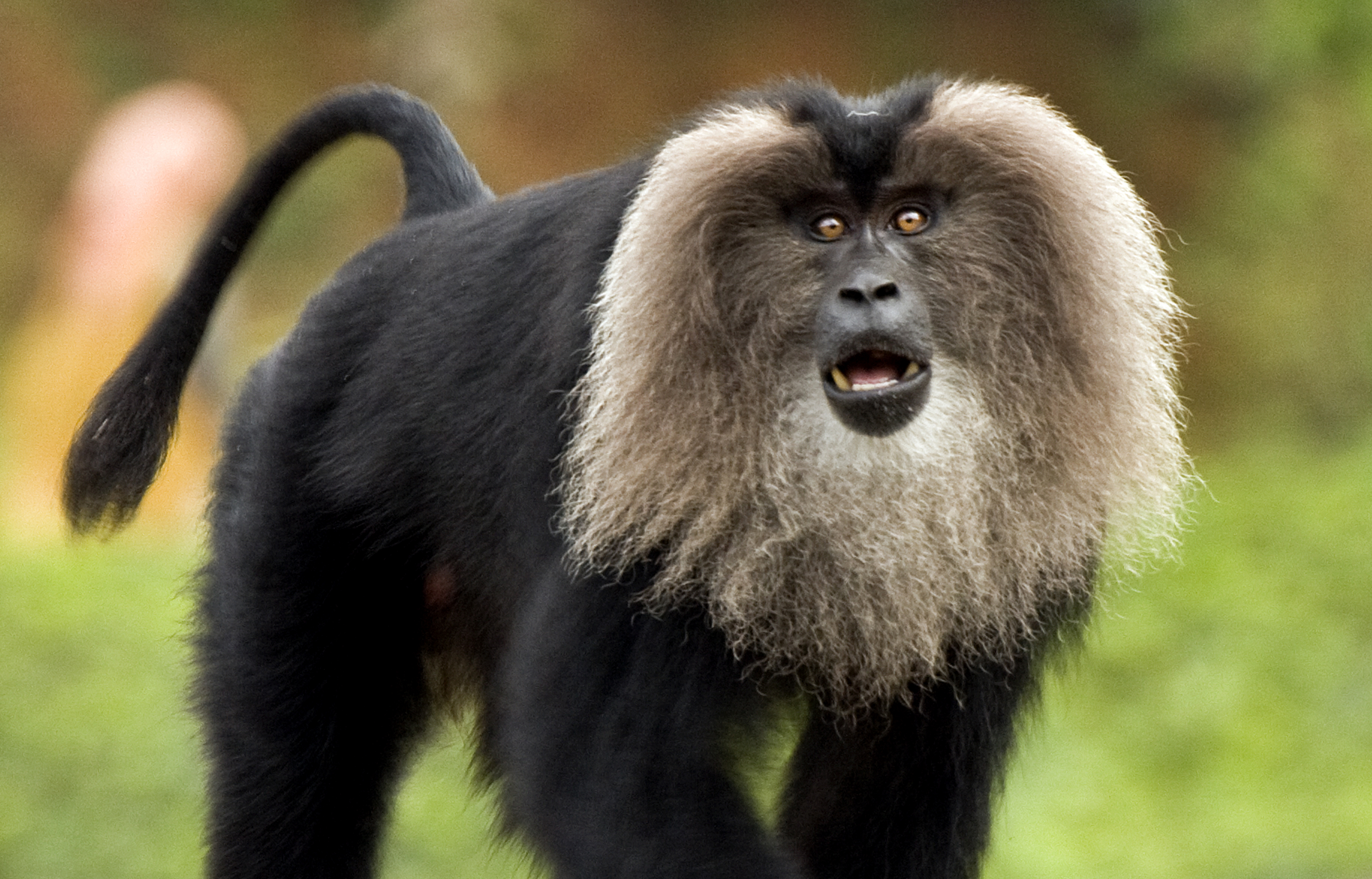
Silent Valley is home to the largest population of lion-tailed macaque. They are among the world's rarest and most threatened primate.

After the announcement of imminent dam construction the valley became the focal point of Save Silent Valley Movement, India's fiercest environmental debate of the decade. Because of concern about the endangered lion-tailed macaque, the issue was brought to public attention. Romulus Whitaker, founder of the Madras Snake Park and the Madras Crocodile Bank, was probably the first person to draw public attention to the small and remote area. In 1977 the Kerala Forest Research Institute carried out an ecological impact study of the Silent Valley area and proposed that the area be declared a biosphere reserve. In 1978 Morarji Desai, Prime Minister of India, approved the project, with the condition that the state government enact legislation ensuring the necessary safeguards. Also that year the IUCN (International Union of Conservation of Nature) passed a resolution recommending protection of lion-tailed macaques in Silent Valley and Kalakkad and the controversy heated up. In 1979 the Government of Kerala passed legislation regarding the Silent Valley Protection Area (Protection of Ecological balance Act of 1979) and issued a notification declaring the exclusion of the hydroelectric project area from the proposed national park.

== Participants ==
Kerala Sasthra Sahithya Parishad (KSSP) effectively aroused public opinion on the requirement to save Silent Valley. They also published a techno-economic and socio-political assessment report on the Silent Valley hydroelectric project. The poet activist Sugathakumari played an important role in the Silent Valley protest and her poem "Marathinu Stuthi" ("Ode to a Tree") became a symbol for the protest from the intellectual community and was the opening song/prayer of most of the "save the Silent Valley" campaign meetings. Dr. Salim Ali, eminent ornithologist of the Bombay Natural History Society, visited the valley and appealed for cancellation of the hydroelectric project. A petition of writ was filed before the High Court of Kerala, against the clear cutting of forests in the hydroelectric project area and the court ordered a stop to the clear cutting.

Dr. M. S. Swaminathan, a renowned agricultural scientist, and then secretary to the Department of Agriculture, called at the Silent Valley region and his suggestion was 389.52 km^{2} including the Silent Valley (89.52 km^{2}), New Amarambalam (80 km^{2}), Attappadi (120 km^{2}) in Kerala and Kunda in Tamil Nadu (100 km^{2}) reserve forests, should be made into a national rainforest biosphere reserve, with the aim of "preventing erosion of valuable genes from the area".Listen:(8:46) to Dr. M. S. Swaminathan speaking on Sustainable Development, p.83, August 27, 2002

In January 1980 the High Court of Kerala lifted the ban on clear cutting, but then the Prime Minister of India requested the Government of Kerala to stop further works in the project area until all aspects were fully discussed. In December, the Government of Kerala declared the Silent Valley area, excluding the hydroelectric project area, as a national park.

In 1982, a multidisciplinary committee with Prof. M. G. K. Menon as chairman and Madhav Gadgil, Dilip K. Biswas and others as members, was created to decide if the hydroelectric project was feasible without any significant ecological damage. Early in 1983, Prof. Menon's Committee submitted its report. After a careful study of the Menon report, the Prime Minister of India decided to abandon the Project. On 31 October 1984 Indira Gandhi was assassinated and on 15 November the Silent Valley forests were declared as a national park, though the boundaries of the Silent Valley Park were limited and no buffer zone was created, despite recommendations by expert committees and scientists.

== Park inaugurated ==
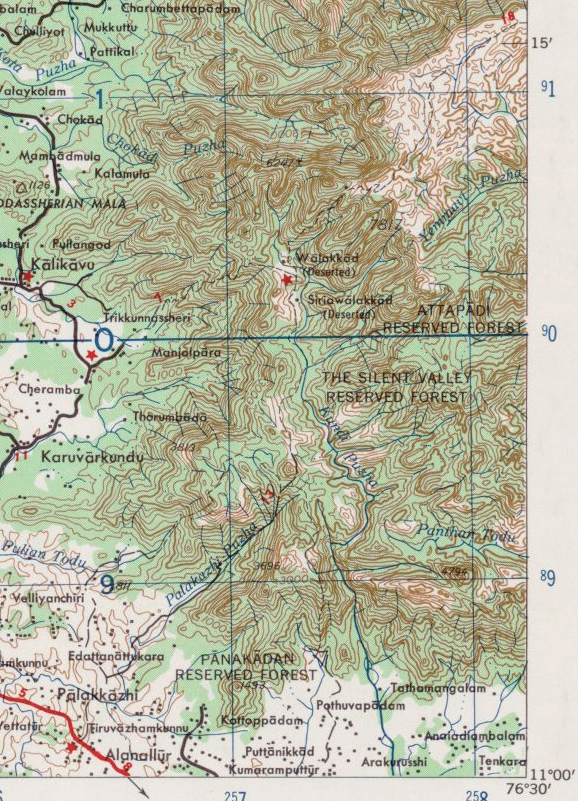
Silent Valley National Park Topography 1:250,000., 1959

Ten years later, on 7 September 1985, the Silent Valley National Park was formally inaugurated and a memorial at Sairandhri to Indira Gandhi was unveiled by Rajiv Gandhi, the new Prime Minister of India. On 1 September 1986 Silent Valley National Park was designated as the core area of the Nilgiri Biosphere.

Since then, a long-term conservation effort has been undertaken to preserve the Silent Valley ecosystem.

In 2001 a new hydro project was proposed and the "man vs. monkey debate" was revived. The proposed site of the dam (64.5 m high and 275 m long) is just 3.5 km downstream of the old dam site at Sairandhiri, 500 m outside the national park boundary. The 84 km^{2} catchment of the project area included 79 km^{2} of the Silent Valley National Park. However, The spectacular waterfall between the Neelikkal and Pathrakkadavu hills bordering the Silent Valley will disappear if the proposed Pathrakkadavu hydro-electric project is implemented. – Image

From January to May 2003 a rapid Environmental Impact Assessment (EIA) was carried out by the Thiruvananthapuram-based Environmental Resources Research Centre and its report was released in December, stating that forest lost due to the project would be just .2216 km^{2}, not including the 7.4 km approach road and land to be acquired for the powerhouse in Karapadam.

== Present status ==
- Little more was heard till 15 November 2006 when Kerala Minister for Forest Binoy Viswam said that the proposed buffer zone for Silent Valley would be declared soon.
- On 21 February 2007 Chief Minister A. K. Antony told reporters after a cabinet meeting that "when the Silent Valley proposal was dropped, the centre had promised to give clearance to the Pooyamkutty project. This promise, however, had not been honoured. The Kerala government has not taken any decision on reviving the Silent Valley Hydel Project".
- On 22 March 2007 the activist poet Sugathakumari appealed to the Chief Minister of Kerala to restrain the Electricity Minister from reviving the proposal for a hydroelectric project at Pathrakkadavu.
- On 18 April 2007, Kerala Chief Minister V. S. Achuthanandan and his cabinet approved the Pathrakkadavu Hydro-electric project and sent it to the Union Government for environmental approval.,
- The 147.22 km^{2} Silent Valley Buffer Zone was formally approved by the Kerala Cabinet on June 6, 2007. The cabinet also sanctioned 35 staff to protect the area and two new forest stations in Bhavani range at Anavai and Thudukki. The zone is aimed at checking the illicit cultivation of ganja, poaching and illicit brewing in areas adjacent to Silent Valley and help long-term sustainability of the protected area.

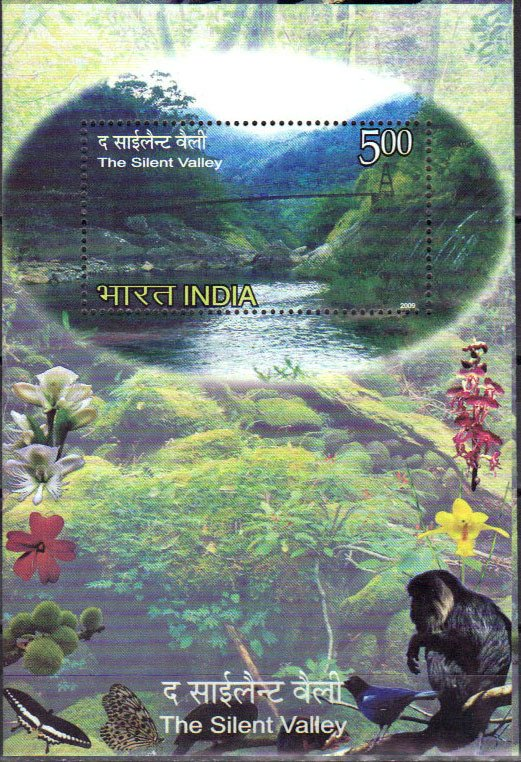
A 2009 souvenir sheet marking the 25th anniversary of Silent Valley National Park

== Movie ==
External videos
- Only An Axe Away on Vimeo

Only An Axe Away (2003) is a well-researched film documentary (40 min) on the struggle to preserve the Silent Valley. The film shares the anxiety of the people of Kerala about the future of the Silent Valley. It has been made by P. Baburaj and C. Saratchandran.
