= R. V. G. Menon =

Indian engineer

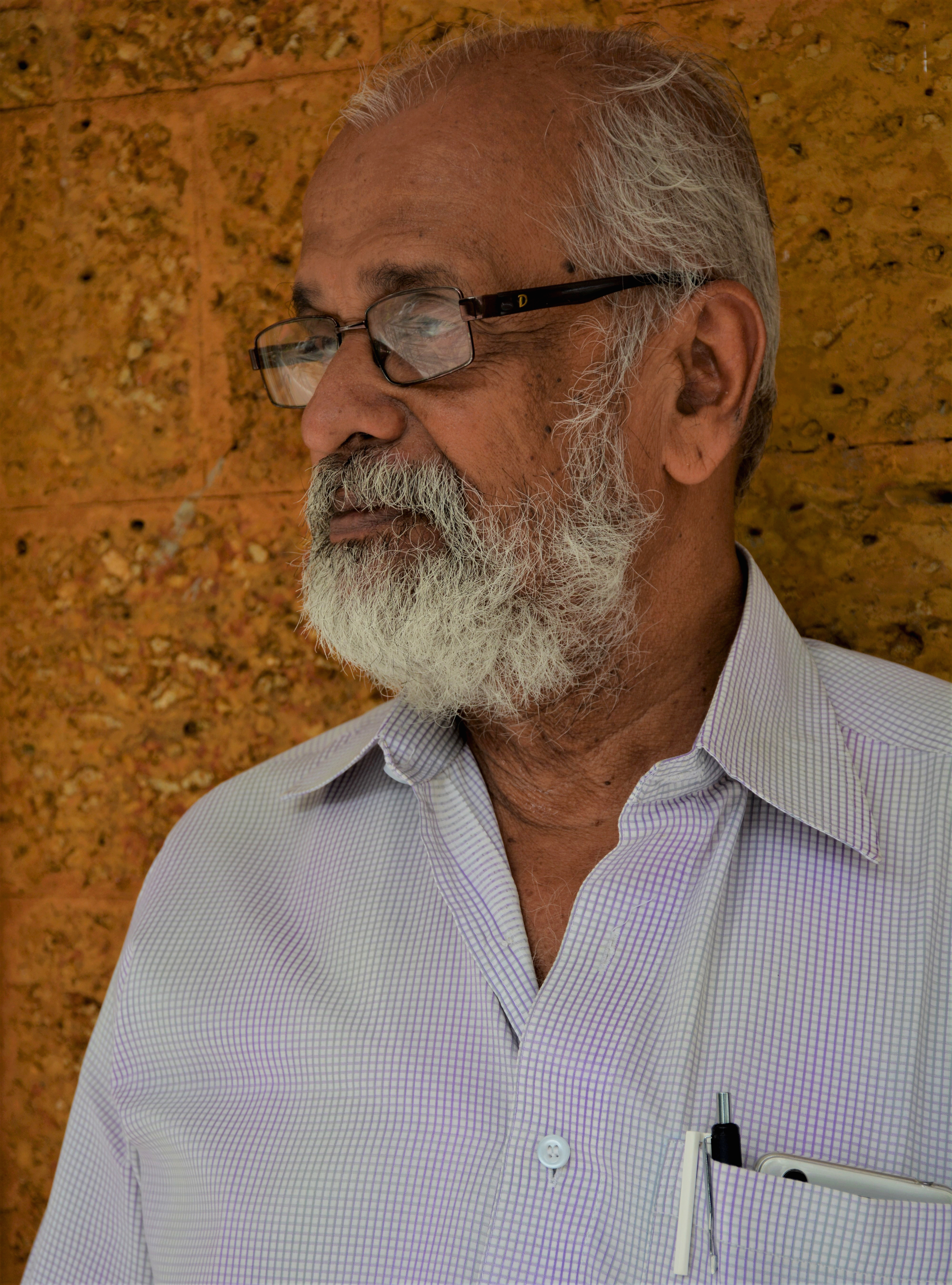

Principal of Government College of Engineering, Kannur
- In office 1995–1996

R. V. G. Menon is a professor of engineering in Kerala, India. He was the principal of Government College of Engineering, Kannur. He was deputed as the director of Agency for Non-conventional Energy and Rural Technology (ANERT). He is the author of An Introduction To The History And Philosophy of Science, which is a part of the engineering curriculum in Kerala.

Menon served as president of Kerala Sasthra Sahithya Parishad, the "Peoples' Science Movement".
