= Njeliyanparambu =

- Country: India
- State: Kerala
- District: Kozhikode
- ISO 3166 code: IN-KL

Njeliyanparambu is a place on the outskirts of the city of Kozhikode in Kerala, India. It is located 6km away from Kozhikode and has gained prominence for being a dumping ground for Kozhikode city.
