= Avittathur =

- Village
- Location in Kerala, India Avittathur (India)
- Coordinates: 10.330815°N 76.244860°E
- Country: India
- State: Kerala
- District: Thrissur
- Tehsil: Mukundapuram

Government
  - Type: Grama Panchayat
  - Body: Velukara Grama Panchayat

Languages
  - Official: Malayalam, English
- Time zone: UTC+5:30 (IST)
- Pin Code: 680683

Avittathur is a village in Mukundapuram taluk, Thrissur district in the state of Kerala, India. It was one of the 64 original Brahmin settlement in the Kerala state. It is famous for an ancient shiva temple, where 4 very old inscriptions have been discovered. According to legend, the temple was consecrated by sage agastya and the name of the village was originally agastyaputtur but it seems to be just the Sanskritization of the word. Legendary Chakyar Koothu and Koodiyattam maestro Nātyāchārya Vidūshakaratnam Padma Shri Māni Mādhava Chākyār used to perform here for decades.
