= Kalakkad =

Kalakad
- Town
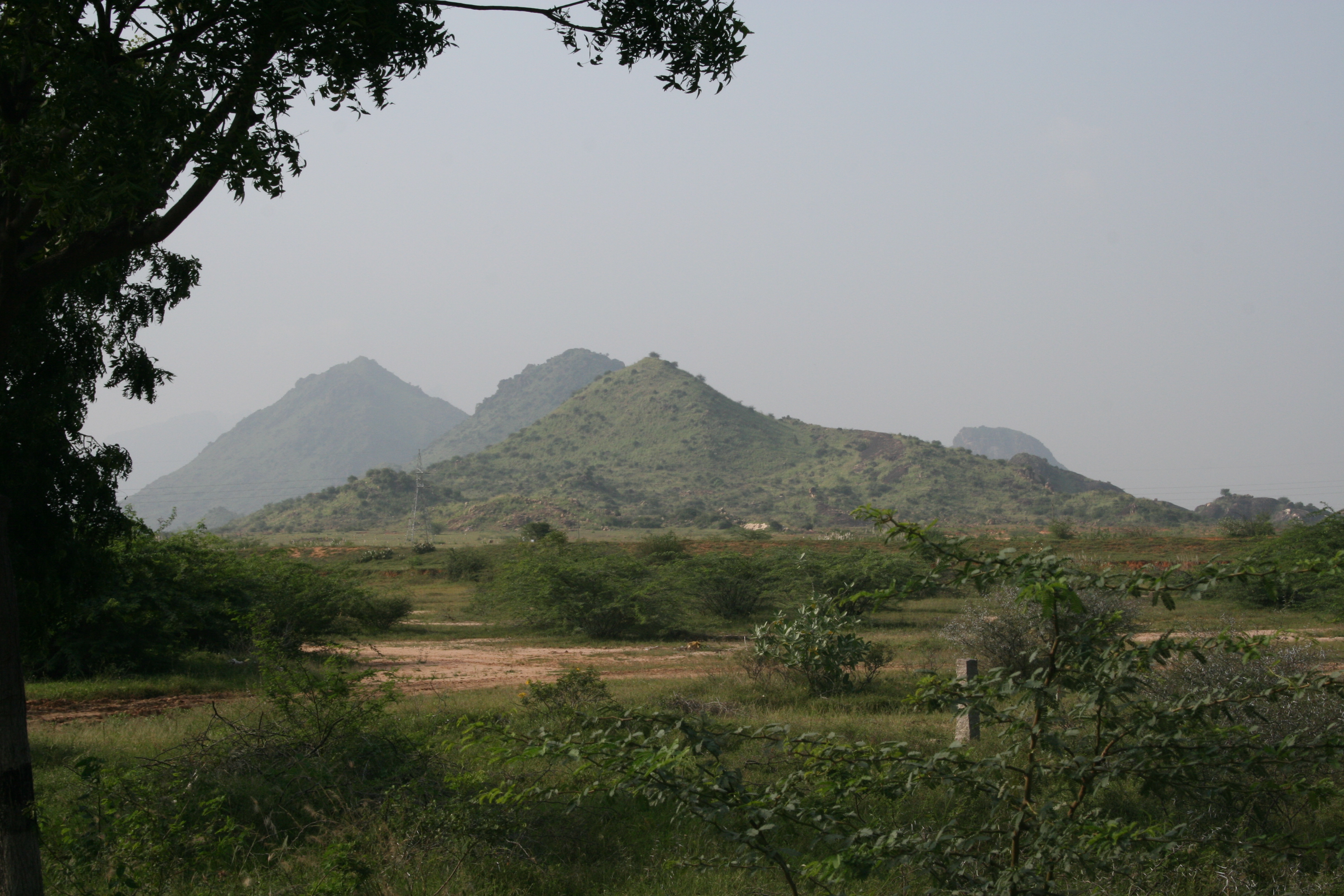
- Hills near Kalakkad

- Location in Tamil Nadu, India
- Coordinates: 8.512°N 77.558°E
- Country: India
- State: Tamil Nadu
- District: Tirunelveli

Government
  - Type: Municipality
  - Body: Kalakkad Municipality

Population (2011)
  - Total: 30,921

Languages
  - Official: Tamil
- Time zone: UTC+5:30 (IST)
- Postal code: 627501

Kalakad is a Town in Tirunelveli district in the Indian state of Tamil Nadu. Kalakad is one of the 3 Municipalities of Tirunelveli District, and is one of the fastest-growing towns in the district.

== Etymology ==
As per popular folklore, the name Kalakkad was due to one of the following:

1. The place was a forest full of 'kalaa' களா(Tamil word) tree;
2. It was a battlefield or 'kalam'களம் (Tamil word);
3. It was the capital of 'kalapirars' who ruled Tamil Nadu from this place.

== History ==
In History of Travancore from the Earliest Times, A. Mohamed Basith mentions Kalacaud instead of Kalakkad. A few battles between the Travancore Kings and the British at this place are recorded. Joannes de Lannoy, the only son of Eustachius De Lannoy, was killed in the battle of Kalakkad on 14 September 1765 at the age of twenty.

Kalakkad was a scene of frequent struggles in the late 1750s during the Polygar revolt led by the Puli Thevar and changed hands several times.

The village was the capital of Pandya kings briefly. A rest house constructed by the British is still there at Sengaltheri in the nearby mountains.

Even today, people refer to Kottai(கோட்டை), the equivalent of a fort, in this area, although no traces of it remain.

== Geography ==
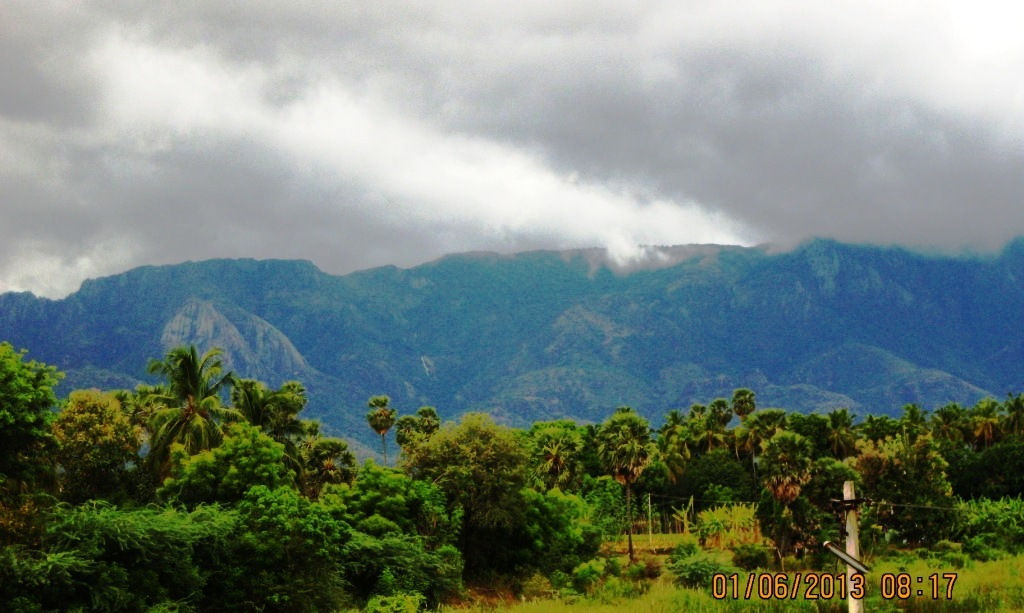
View of Western Ghats from Kalakkad

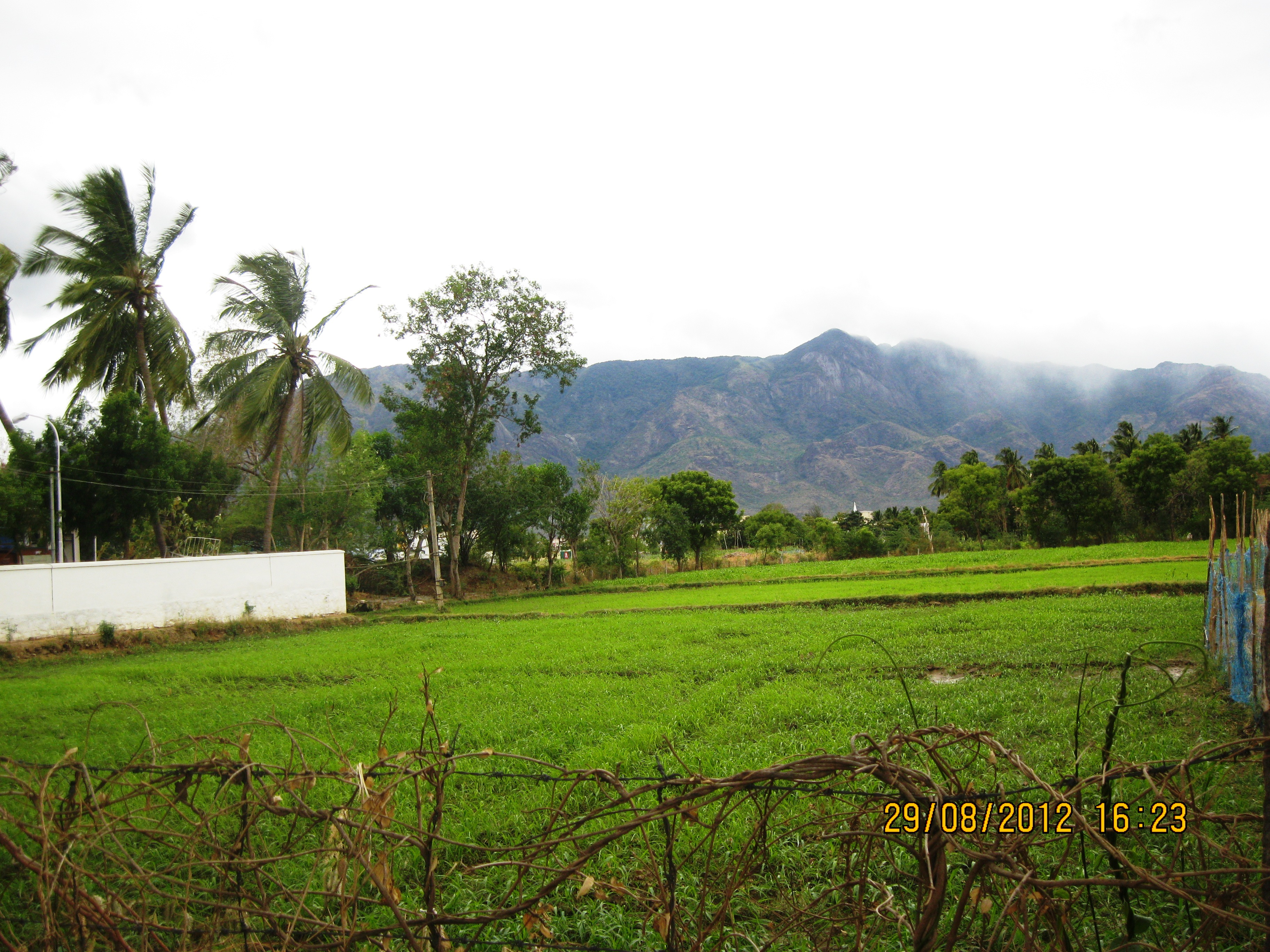
Roadside view of Kalakkad Hills

Kalakad is surrounded on three sides by the Western Ghats. The forest area is protected as KMTR Kalakkad Mundanthurai Tiger Reserve. It is home to many endangered animals such as lion-tailed macaque etc. It is a tiger sanctuary also, though differing counts are put forward by the government about the correct number of tigers.

The village is surrounded by vegetation, and it is probably one of the most fertile locations in Tirunelveli district. In fact, this was one reason why it changed many hands from Cheras to Pandyas to Nawab to the English. Recently (about 30 years back) a small dam, known as Vadakku Pachayar dam has been constructed by the Government of Tamil Nadu. Vadaku Pachayar is a tributary of Tamirabarani river which merges near Tharuvai. Even when there is no water in, say Courtralam, it is said that water is available here always for tourists to visit and enjoy. To enter into the sanctuary areas, you need to get special permission from forest department. However, the dam is approachable without such a permit. The climate of Kalakad is usually cool and breezy because of the Western Ghats.

The forest areas have been declared as a protected tiger reserve – Kalakkad Mundanthurai Sanctuary.

== Demographics ==
As of the 2011 India census, Kalakkad had a population of 30,921. Males constitute 48.9% of the population and females 51.1%. Kalakkad has an average literacy rate of 78.93%, higher than the national average of 72.99%: male literacy is 82.8%, and female literacy is 75.21%. In Kalakkad, 10.18% of the population is under 6 years of age.

== Government ==
Currently, The Chairman of the Town Panchayat is PC Rajan, who hails from a nearby village called Manjuvilai.

== Municipality ==
The Municipality of Kalakkad has several streets, running around the Sathyavageeswarar temple. Generally, the streets were inhabited by people of specific castes, though these days one can find a mixture of people in all the streets. The Municipality is surrounded by lush green paddy fields, with the western ghats at the horizon. Many small waterfalls can be seen in the distant mountains. Maalai (Garland) aruvi near Sengaltheri can be seen from a distance of almost 8 km.

There are several other temples for Mutharamman, Isakkiamman, Suadalaimadan and Ayyanar in the Municipality Pari Vettai and Kodai Vizha are annual festivals which are celebrated in these temples.

== Landmarks ==
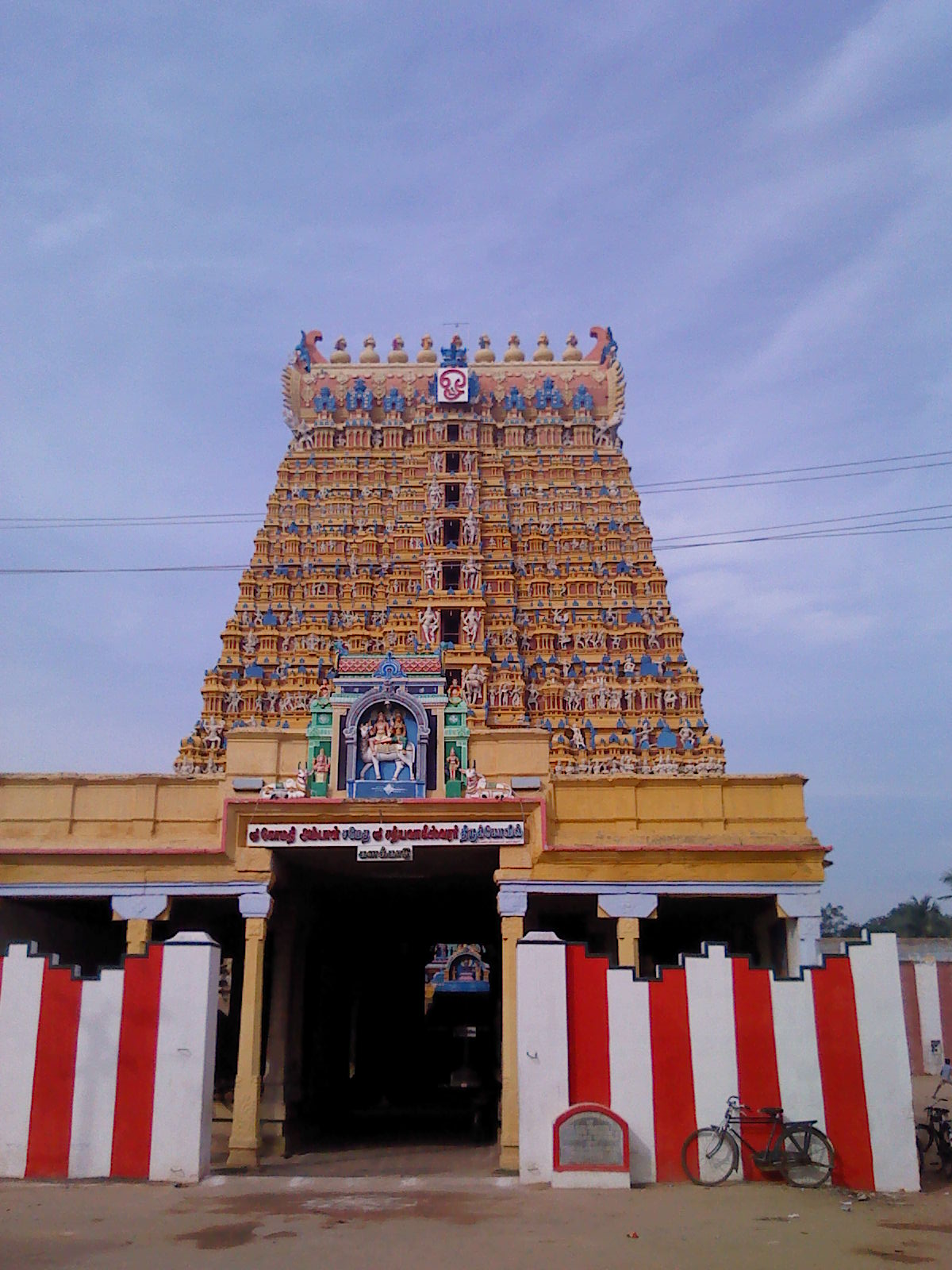
Gomathiambal, Sathyavageeswarar Temple in Kalakkad was constructed by King Marthanda Varma.

Sathya Vageeswarar Temple is dedicated to Sathyavageeswarar (Lord Siva). The other principal deity is Goddess Gomathi. Dating back to the 13th century AD or the late Pandya period, further additions were made till the 17th century AD.

Kalakad has around 6 Major mosques in and around Kalakad town. The biggest mosque is located in Kottai (கோட்டை) which is the heart of town, the 2nd biggest in Singampathu. The rest are in Viyasaraja puram, Kovilpathu, Salai Nayinar pallivasal & Kesavaneri.

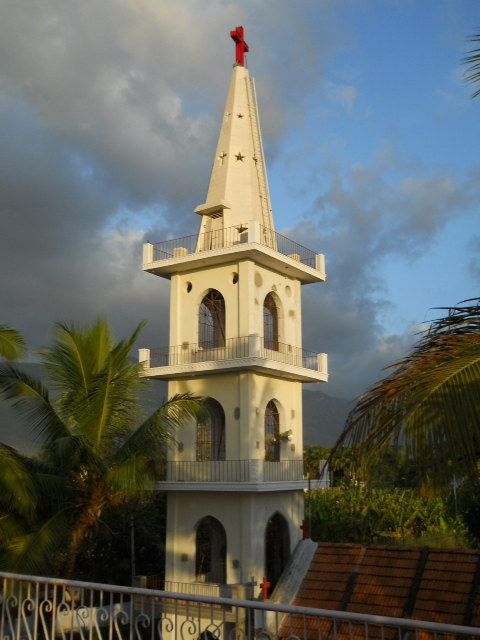
St Paul Lutheran Church at Nagankulam kalakad

Kalakkad has many churches. They are affiliated to the Lutheran Church, Tirunelveli Diocese Church of South India (CSI) and other denominations (Roman Catholic, Assembly of God, Indian Pentecostal Church, The Pentecostal Mission and possibly other unaffiliated/independent churches). The biggest church in Kalakad is St. Paul Lutheran Church of Lutheran at Nagankulam. The tower in front of the church is about 85 feet high.

== Transportation ==
Kalakad can be reached from Tirunelveli, Nanguneri and Vallioor etc. by bus. The nearest railway station is Nanguneri. Nearest airports are at Thiruvananthapuram and Madurai. Tuticorin also has an airstrip having two flights a day to Chennai (MAA)and is about 80 km away.

Many private buses like SGKR, Sakthi, Shree Ganapathy, Priya Bus and minibuses provide transport facilities for small villages as there is a long gap of time duration for government buses.

== School ==
Kalakkad has three higher secondary schools: Government Higher Secondary School, Girl's Higher Secondary School run by Kuntrakudi Adheenam, KAMP Meerania Higher Secondary School run by a minority community trust (all are state board schools) and two private matriculation higher secondary schools(St. Johns and Nes) in addition to many primary schools. Generally, the people living here are well-educated.

== Notable people ==
- Vidharth, star of the Tamil movie Mynaa
- Visu (director), an actor and director of Tamil movies
