= Children's Indradanush =

Children's Indradanush is a children's publication run by activists of All India People's Science Network (AIPSN). The meaning of the title is "Rainbow".

It is mainly supported by Himachal Gyan Vigyan Samiti, a member of AIPSN. This magazine has circulation in various states of Northern India like Himachal Pradesh, UP, Bihar, Delhi, Chhattisgarh and Uttarakhand. Many articles are on general topics addressing rural children of Northern India. The magazine gives importance to scientific attitude and temper. It is run mostly by volunteer commitments.
