= Pondicherry Science Forum =

Nonprofit organization in India

- Science for Social Revolution
- Abbreviation: PSF
- Founded: 1985
- Type: People's Movement (reg under Indian Society act)
- Location: Puducherry
- President: Amouda
- General Secretary: P.Ravichandiran
- Vice President: Hemavathi
- Website: www.psfcerd.org

Pondicherry Science Forum (PSF) was founded in 1985 as "a non profit, voluntary, public-interest organization" which is based in Puducherry, India. It works primarily on issues related to science policy and science popularization.

== Publications ==
- Ariviyal Murasu (monthly)
- Children's Indradanush
- Samam News Letter (monthly)
- Thulir Magazine (monthly)
