= Kerala Sasthra Sahithya Parishad =

Indian science communication organization

Kerala Sastra Sahitya Parishad
- Founded: 1962
- Founder: K. Bhaskaran Nair; C.K.D. Panicker; K.G. Adiyodi; Konniur Narendranath; K.K. Nair; K.K.P. Menon
- Type: People's Science Movement
- Purpose: Promotion of scientific temper, rational thinking, and a scientific approach to societal issues
- Location: Thrissur
- Region served: Kerala, India
- Members: 60,000 (Approx.)
- Key people: TK Meera bai (President); PV Divakaran ( General Secretary
- Website: kssp.in

Kerala Sasthra Sahithya Parishad (KSSP) (lit. 'Kerala Science Literature Movement') is a prominent science and literature organization based in the Indian state of Kerala. It was founded in 1962 with the aim of promoting scientific temper, rational thinking, and a scientific approach to societal issues. The organization has played a significant role in popularizing science and scientific knowledge among the general public, particularly in the Malayalam-speaking region.

It was conceived as a people's science movement. When it was founded in 1962, it was a 40-member group consisting of science writers and teachers, with an interest in science from a social perspective. Its membership has grown to about 60,000 in about 2,300 units spread over Kerala. In 1996, the group received the Right Livelihood Award "for its major contribution to a model of development rooted in social justice and popular participation."

== Introduction ==
The original objective of KSSP was limited to publishing scientific literature in Malayalam, the local language, and popularizing science. However it was soon realized that publication and giving lessons were not enough to popularize science. KSSP chose as its mission giving people the tools of science and technology. Thus in 1974, KSSP decided to become a people's science movement and adopted "science for social revolution" as its motto. It has grown into a people's science movement with a membership of about 60,000 and distributed in about 2,300 units within the state of Kerala. KSSP is involved, broadly in three types of activities: education, agitatative (sic), and constructive(sic), in areas like environment, health, education, energy, literacy, micro planning and development in general.

Meerabhai is the president and Divakaran PV the general secretary. Intellectuals and activists such as M.K. Prasad, R.V.G. Menon, Kavumbayi Balakrishnan, B. Ekbal, K.K. Krishnakumar, Prof K.R. Janardanan, R. Radhakrishnan, K. Pappooty, M. P. Parameswaran, Kunhikkannan T.P., T. Radhamani, Dr K.N. Ganesh, Dr K.P. Aravindan, T. Gangandharan, A. Achuthan have been past presidents of the organization.

== History ==
On September 10, 1962, Kozhikode Devagiri College, Principal Fr. Theodosius inaugurated the Kerala Sasthra Sahithya Parishad. K. Bhaskaran Nair was the first president.

== Publications ==
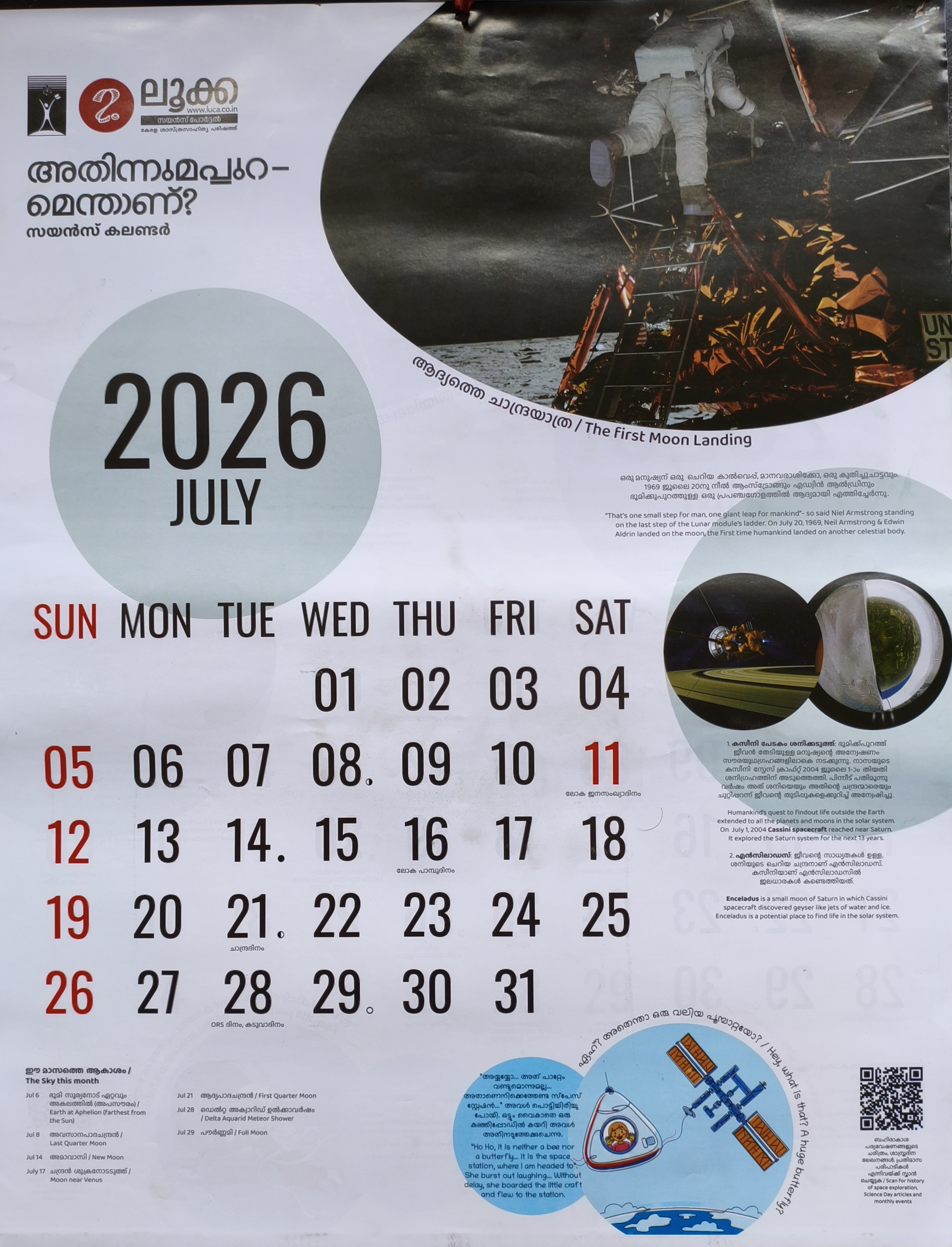
The 2026 edition of the 'Luca' science calendar published by the Kerala Sasthra Sahithya Parishad, themed on space exploration.

The Kerala Sasthra Sahithya Parishad (KSSP) primarily publishes three periodicals.

1. Shastragati (lit. Scientific Odyssey): This magazine engages in discussions on profound topics that impact the general public, focusing on issues with societal relevance. While the publication's primary goal is dissemination, it is also a platform for diverse perspectives (not necessarily in agreement with the organization's stance) to be presented.
2. Shastrakeralam (lit. Science Kerala): This publication is primarily targeted at high school and higher secondary students. The main objective is to instill scientific awareness and thinking among students in both high school and higher secondary classes.
3. Eureka: This bilingual magazine aims to cultivate scientific thinking among children up to primary class students through games and songs. The focus is on nurturing scientific curiosity and understanding among young minds.

Additionally, KSSP publishes a news bulletin, 'Parishad Varta,' which serves as a source of news for the organization's activists. It covers news and contemporary issues in science and social domains, reflecting the perspectives and positions of the organization. KSSP has also published hundreds of books and booklets covering numerous social issues, including Jeevarekha by Dr. M. P. Parameswaran. 'LUCA Science Portal' is KSSP's online science portal that features scientific literature and discussions, and it is named after the acronym for "Last Universal Common Ancestor".

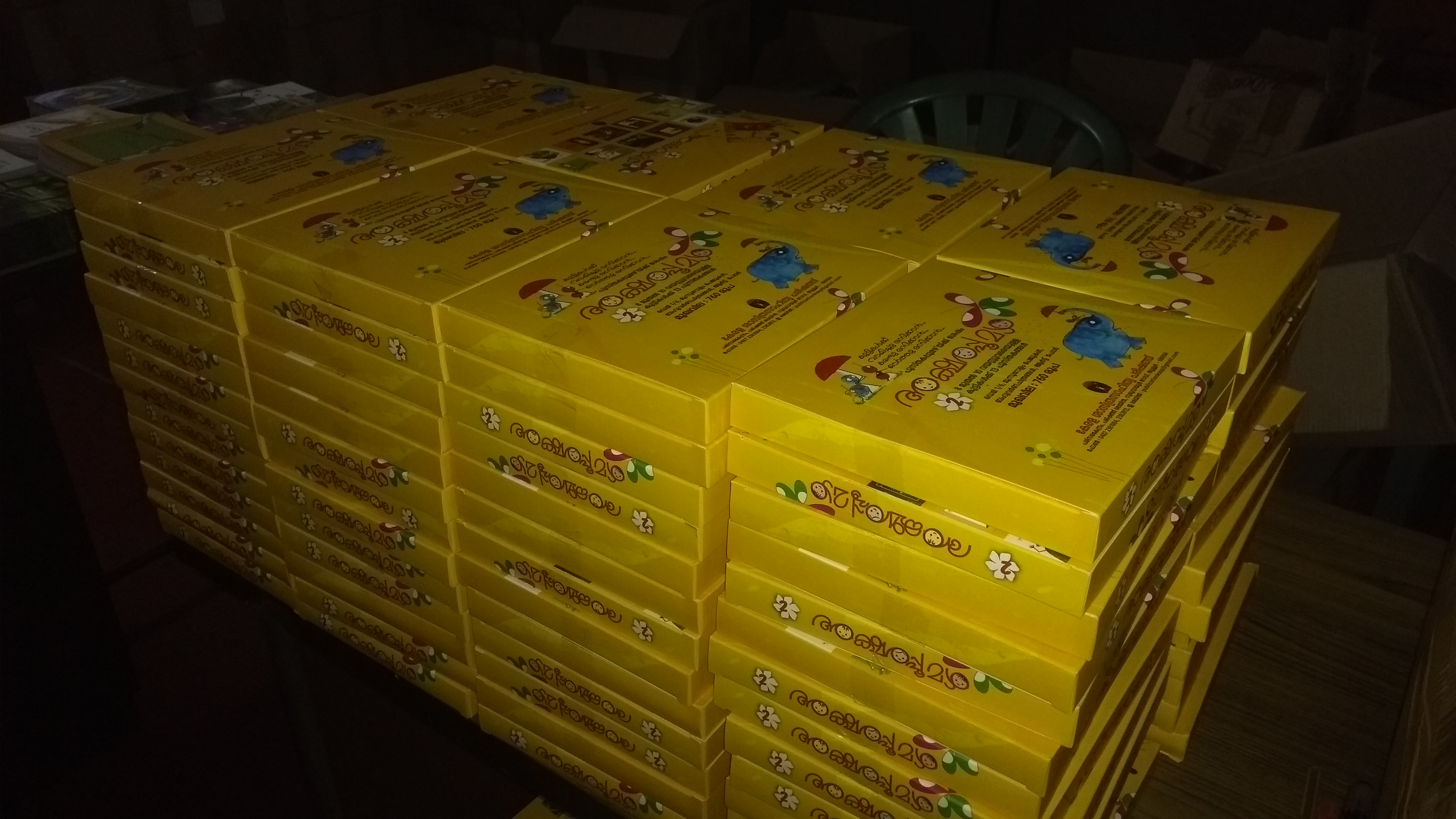
Books published by KSSP

== Research ==
=== Kerala Padanam ===
In 2004, KSSP conducted a survey of the living conditions in Kerala. The survey was titled Kerala Padanam-Keralam engane jeevikkunnu Keralam Engane Chinthikkunnu, translated as The Kerala Study-How Does Kerala Live? How Does Kerala Think?. It covered about 6000 households in the state. The activists spent time with each family to understand their lifestyle and thoughts. The population of Kerala has been divided into four classes or groups. Around 40% of the people are very poor, and only a minority of about 10% of the people belong to the upper middle class and control their state of affairs. The findings were published in a book with the same title as the survey Kerala Padanam-Keralam engane jeevikkunnu Keralam Engane Chinthikkunnu.

== Products ==
KSSP has developed self-reliant products and marketed them though its units and the local offices of the Parishad Production Centre and the Samata Production Centre which are attached to district KSSP offices.

=== Hot box ===
Hot box is an energy efficient thermocol box which keeps the temperature constant, saving energy and fuel. It is used for rice cooking and keeping normal food items hot. When rice is cooked normally, the fire is maintained until it is cooked. If the water temperature can be maintained at 100 °C (212 °F) without further heating, fuel is saved. This is what the hot box is designed to do. Rice is cooked in water until it has boiled and the bowl is put in the hot box until it is fully cooked.

=== Portable Bio gas Plant ===
Integrated Rural Technology Centre (IRTC), the research wing of KSSP has launched another product, the Portable bio gas plant. This helps with the proper disposal of waste and conserves energy.
