= Bangiya Bijnan Parishad =

Organization to promote science

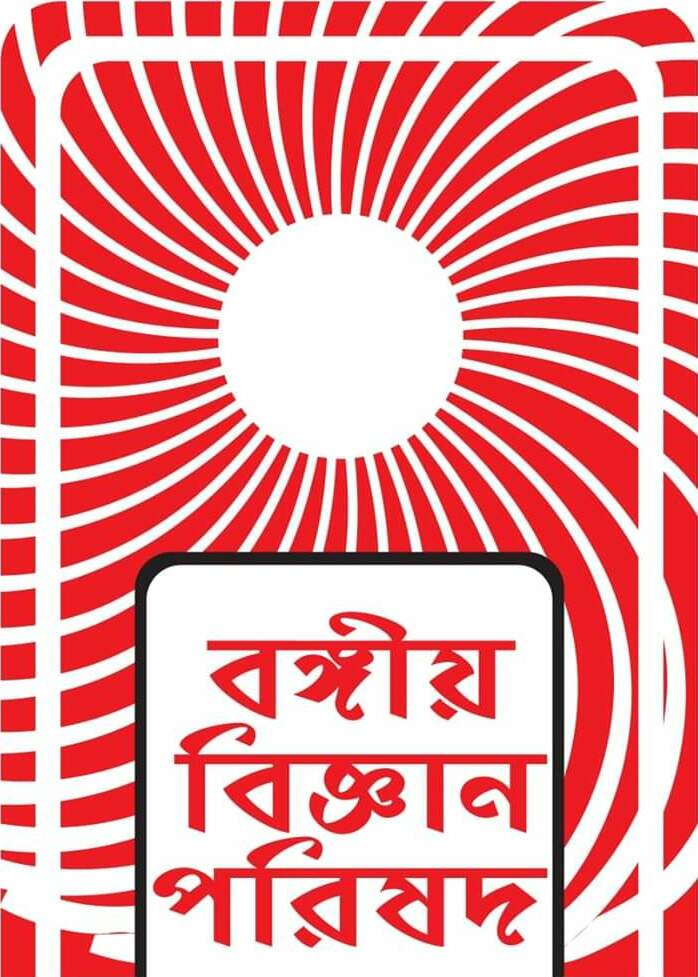
- Logo of Bangiya Bijnan Parishad
- Founder: Satyendra Nath Bose
- Established: 25 January 1948; 78 years ago
- Mission: Cultivation and popularization of science and scientific knowledge
- Focus: Study and development of the science in Bengali Language
- Address: P-23, Raja Rajkrishna Street, Kolkata-700 006
- Location: Kolkata, Kolkata, West Bengal, India
- Website: bangiyabijnanparishad.org

Bangiya Bijnan Parishad (Bengali: বঙ্গীয় বিজ্ঞান পরিষদ, romanized: Bôṅgīyô Bijñan Pôriṣôd, transl. Bengali Science Council) is a science organization founded by Satyendra Nath Bose in 1948. As a science organization, the Bangiya Bijnan Parishad led the Science-Movement. Nowadays, many science movement organization take the inspiration from Bangiya Bijnan Parishad directly or indirectly.

From the Commencement, Bangiya Bijnan Parishad publishes a monthly journal of science in Bengali language, named Jnan-O-Bijnan since January 1948.

In 1948 Gopal Chandra Bhattacharya worked with Satyendra Nath Bose (of Bose–Einstein statistics fame) to establish the society for science research.

== History ==
To spread the knowledge of science in our own Mother tongue, Satyendra Nath Bose determined to found a science organization in Bengal. On 18 October 1947, some Science fond of Calcutta Science College decided to established a science organization. On 25 January 1948, Bangiya Bijnan Parishad was founded by Satyendra Nath Bose. It take some determination like to spread the science in Mother tongue, to make the science easy for the school student using appropriate word in Bengali, to publish science book and magazine for school and college student etc. As the mouthpiece of the council the Jnan-O-Bijnan magazine was published in the founding Day.
