= Tamil Nadu Science Forum =

Tamil Nadu Science Forum (TNSF) is a people's movement (a registered society) committed to science popularization and education. Started in 1980 by a group of research scholars of Madras University, it functioned during the 80's mainly as an organizer of popular science lectures. In 1987, with the starting of Thulir Magazine, a monthly children's science magazine in Tamil, the group moved on to science communication among children. During the years 1987 to 1991, it mobilized school science teachers in a large way and started organizing efforts in teacher re-orientation so as to make science education more enjoyable.

== Total Literacy Campaigns ==
The starting of Total Literacy Campaigns in 1991 in Tamil Nadu turned out to be a turning point for TNSF. The Forum’s intense involvement in Arivoli Iyakkam, the total literacy campaign in Tamil Nadu, turned it into a people's movement, identifying with the needs of the poorest sections of rural society. The group provided the lead in these campaigns by assisting the District Literacy Societies in planning the various aspects of the campaign. Its members got involved in a big way in the implementation of the programme in the first 10 districts in which these campaigns were taken up. This experience brought TNSF into a meaningful relationship with extremely poor and oppressed sections of our society, and completely transformed its agenda and the style of its functioning.

== Working Areas ==
Science Communication,
Universal Education, 
Universal Health Care, 
Women's Self-reliance,
Environment Education & Sustainable Development.

== Science Publications ==
- Thulir Magazine (monthly),
- Jantar Mantar Magazine (bi monthly),
- Vizhutu Magazine (bi monthly),
- Vigyana Siragu (monthly private circulation only to TNSF members),
- Arivu Thandral.

While these are periodicals, TNSF's Science Publications Unit produces books on a variety of themes. The book, Anuvilirindu Aagayam Varai, a collection of essays published in 1993, was once adjudged `Best popular science book in Tamil' and has since been named as a textbook by two universities in the state for their undergraduate studies in Tamil, in the technical communication component. Some recent titles follow, which give an idea of the range of interests of TNSF: The bicycle (illustrating science in everyday life), on banned medicines and drugs that ought to be banned (a discussion on drug policy), United We Sit (a handbook for savings groups) � So far, more than a hundred titles have been published.

A form of mass communication that TNSF has extensively used is that of street theatre. This form, with songs, skits and dance drama, has proved to be extremely attractive among the people, particularly in rural areas. TNSF has a collection of street plays on cholera (emphasizing oral rehydration therapy), blood donation, pollution, children's education, gender discrimination, and so on. Apart from these, TNSF organizes, from time to time, slide shows and video shows with themes like `Cosmos', `Evolution', `Health Care', `Nuclear Weapons', `Beyond Savings`, `Use of Pesticides', etc. The last named was produced by the TNSF.

== Programs with Tamil Nadu Department of School Education ==
TNSF is collaborating with the Tamil Nadu public school system on program to popularize mathematics and science education, through the Magil Ganitam program

== Organisation Structure ==
TNSF is a secular and democratic organization and its membership is open to all. TNSF is a registered society, an executive committee coordinates its activities, and the accounts are formally audited. All the activities of TNSF are funded by one of the following:

- Revenue generated from the sale of its publications,
- Donations from individuals,
- Funding from specific sources within India for specified purposes and duration.

TNSF has committed activists in almost all the districts of Tamil Nadu, and its strength lies mainly in rural areas. Below, we present a brief idea of TNSF's work in various areas during the last few years.
