= Kallidaikurichi =

Kallidaikuruchi
- Town
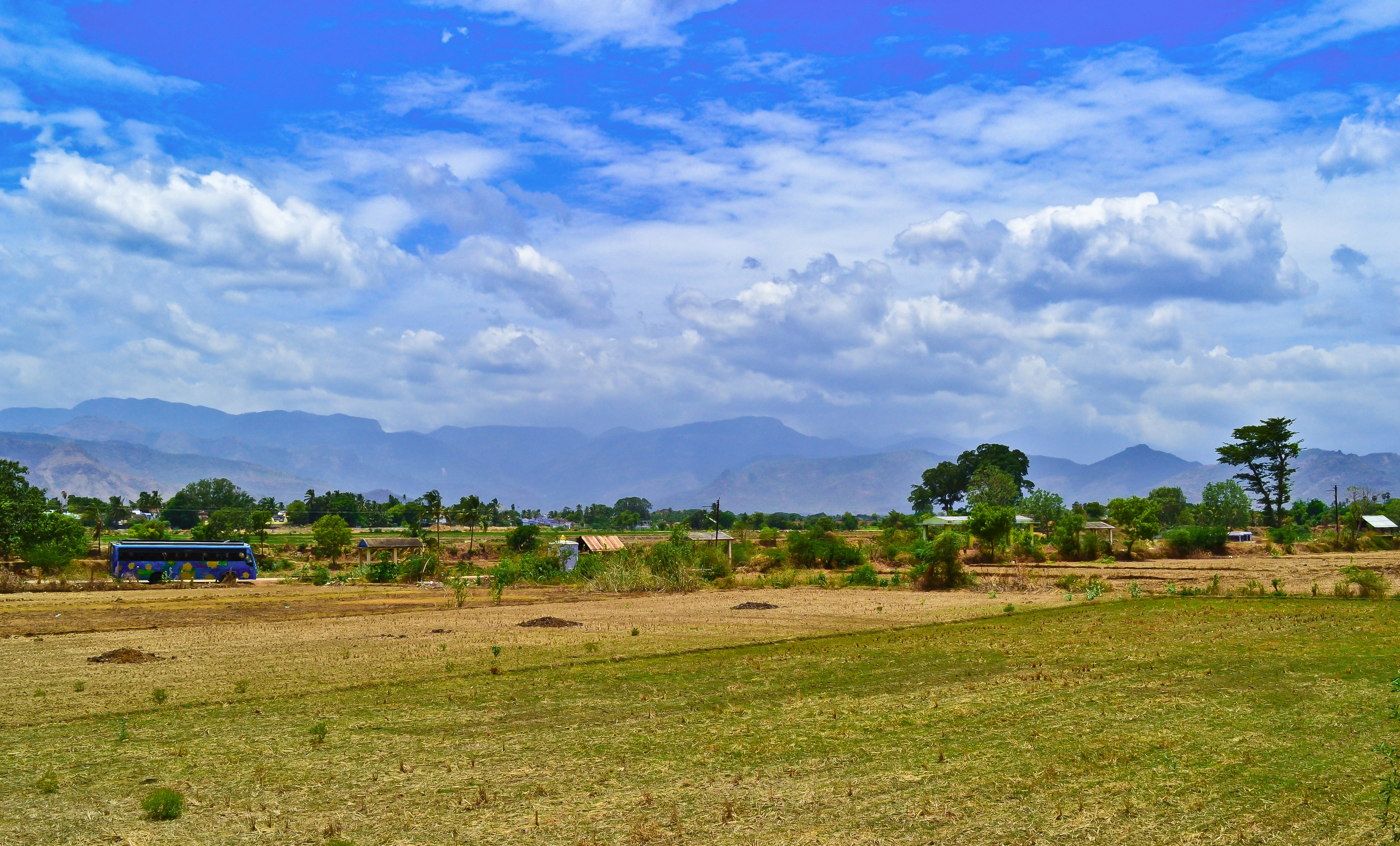
- Kallidaikurichi Landscape

- Location in Tamil Nadu, India
- Coordinates: 8.685°N 77.465°E
- Country: India
- State: Tamil Nadu
- District: Tirunelveli
- Elevation: 75 m (246 ft)

Population (2011)
  - Total: 7,531

Languages
  - Official: Tamil
- Time zone: UTC+5:30 (IST)
- Vehicle registration: TN-72

Kallidaikurichi or Kalladaikurichi is a town on the right bank of the Thamiraparani river in Ambasamudram Taluk of Tirunelveli district in Tamil Nadu, the southernmost state of India.

== Etymology ==
'Kal + idai + kurichi' meaning exactly in Tamil, a village in the midst of hills. (In Sanskrit it has been translated in the 'Bhojanadi' (an astrological treatise) as 'Shilaa - madhya - Hariswam'. In the Thamrabarani Mahatmya of the Matsya Purama, it has been translated as 'Shila - Shalipuram').

== Geography ==
=== Tamiraparni River ===
The Thamirabarani River or Tamiraparni, flows through Kallidaikurichi & Ambasamudram. Originating from the Pothigai malai (also known as Agasthiyamalai) part of the Agasthyamalai Biosphere Reserve, it flows down to the Gulf of Mannar Marine National Park in the Bay of Bengal after traveling for about 125 kilometers in Punnaikayal, a coastal town in Thoothukudi district. In the hills are a number of waterfalls, such as KalyanaTheertham Falls, Banatheertham Falls, Agasthiyar Falls, Manimuthar Falls etc,.

=== Climate ===
Like most parts of Tamil Nadu, the climate here is rather hot, except during the rainy season of the November/December months. During summer strong gusty winds are frequent. Precipitation and wind patterns are very similar to that of Ambasamudram

Climate data for Ambasamudram, Tamil Nadu
Month	Jan	Feb	Mar	Apr	May	Jun	Jul	Aug	Sep	Oct	Nov	Dec	Year
Mean daily maximum °C (°F)	30.0 (86.0)	31.7 (89.1)	33.5 (92.3)	33.7 (92.7)	34.2 (93.6)	32.7 (90.9)	31.8 (89.2)	32.2 (90.0)	32.5 (90.5)	31.5 (88.7)	29.8 (85.6)	29.5 (85.1)	31.9 (89.5)
Mean daily minimum °C (°F)	22.1 (71.8)	22.7 (72.9)	24.2 (75.6)	25.4 (77.7)	26.2 (79.2)	25.5 (77.9)	25.2 (77.4)	25.1 (77.2)	24.8 (76.6)	24.3 (75.7)	23.3 (73.9)	22.4 (72.3)	24.3 (75.7)
Average precipitation mm (inches)	37 (1.5)	30 (1.2)	47 (1.9)	82 (3.2)	71 (2.8)	77 (3.0)	60 (2.4)	39 (1.5)	55 (2.2)	193 (7.6)	202 (8.0)	95 (3.7)	988 (39)
Source: Climate-Data.org

=== Flora and Fauna ===
This southern end of the Western Ghats, is full of flora and fauna. Kalakkad Mundanthurai Range is a wild life park under Project Tiger. Kallidaikurichi has a good bird population, where both residing and migratory birds enjoy the landscape. Birds like Black Kite, Brahminy Kite, Spot-billed pelican, Painted stork, Rose ringed parakeet, Black-headed Ibis, Green bee-eater, Red-wattled lapwing, White-throated kingfisher, Pied Kingfisher, Indian Paradise Flycatcher, Asian Koel, Oriental Darter, Indian myena, Black Drongo, Cattle Egret etc., are commonly seen. Migratory birds like Northern Pintail, Bar-headed Goose, and Eurasian Wigeon etc., also recorded. Every year, Tamiraparni Waterbird Census have been conducted by the Tirunelveli District Administration, jointly with Forest Department and Ashoka Trust for Research in Ecology and the Environment (ATREE)'s Agasthyamalai Community Conservation Centre.

== Demographics ==
=== Population ===
Religious census
Religion	Percent(%)
Hindu	82.31%
Muslim	13.32%
Christian	4.3%
Sikh	0.01%
Buddhist	0.01%
Other	0.00%
No religion	0.06%

As of 2001 India census, Kallidaikurichi had a population of 25,710. Males constitute 49% of the population and females 51%. Kallidaikurichi has an average literacy rate of 78%, higher than the national average of 59.5%: male literacy is 86%, and female literacy is 71%. In Kallidaikurichi, 9% of the population is under 6 years of age.

== Government and politics ==
=== Subdivisions ===
Kallidaikurichi seems to have had the following subdivisions - Madakkurichi, Velankurichi, Cherakumaran and Kallidaikurichi.

== Economy ==
Kallidaikurichi and appalam, murukku are almost synonymous. Appalam making is a major cottage industry here. It is nationally known for its quality and taste and is sent almost all over India.

=== Agriculture ===
Rice is the main crop here. Other crops are groundnut (peanuts), chilies (red pepper) and cotton, though these are seen less frequently nowadays.

The tea plantations are operated by the Bombay Burmah Trading Corporation Ltd on forest lands leased by the government of Tamil Nadu. There are three tea estates within the Manjolai area.

=== Kannadian Channel ===
The Kannadian channel has been constructed at the confluence of the Manimuthar and Thamirabarani rivers near Chinna Sankarankovil, a small village near Ambasamudram & Kallidaikurichi town, about 42 kilometers from Tirunelveli. This Kannadian Channel connects the drought prone areas Of Sathankulam, Thisayanvilai by Intralinking Of Thamirabarani, Karumeniyar And Nambiyar Rivers In Tirunelveli And Thoothukudi Districts Of Tamil Nadu. Tamirabarani-Nambiar Link Canal project - Formation Of New Flood Carrier Canal From LS 6.5 Km Of Existing Kannadian Channel is under progress.

== Culture ==
=== Temples ===
Kallidaikurichi's Hindu shrines have high-rise gopurams.

- Sri Aadhivaraha perumal Temple
- Velakurichi Adheenam
- Thiruvavaduthurai Adheenam
- Sri Kumarar koil
- Sri Manenthiappar Temple
- Sri Pagazhikuththar Temple
- Sri Kulasekaramudayar Temple

==== Idol remains ====
A 16th century bronze Nataraja idol, along with 3 other idols were stolen from the Kulasekaramudayar Temple in 1982. The Idol Wing of the Criminal Investigation Department Department (IW-CID) has traced the Nataraja idol to the Art Gallery of South Australia museum in Australia. The idol was successfully repatriated to the temple in 2019.

=== Music and films ===
Muthuswami Dikshitar, the carnatic composer, whose songs abound with geographic and iconographic references, sings of the curative properties of the river Thamiraparani.

== Transport ==
=== By Air ===
Nearby airports are Tuticorin Domestic Airport in Tamil Nadu, about 90 km away; and Trivandrum International Airport in Kerala, about 145 km away.Madurai International Airport 170 km.

=== Rail ===
Kallidaikurichi railway station is easily reachable to Tirunelveli, Tenkasi, Sengottai.

=== By Road ===
This town is located about 70 km north of Kanyakumari (Cape Comerin). The twin cities of Tirunelveli and Palayamkottai are about 35 km away.

== Education ==
One of the educational institutions here was established over 160 years ago. Originally called the George IV English Middle School, it was later renamed the Tilak Vidyalaya after the independence of India.

Lakshmipathi Middle School, Kallidaikurichi was launched in 1939 under the legacy of the late headmaster A Ramalingam. Its students are renowned for their high positions and have a global presence. This school's primary medium of instruction is Tamil and the student teacher ratio is 33:1. The school tries to provide best learning environment.

The school provides education to students from class 1 to 8. This school's student strength is approximately 302. 525 books are there in the library of this school.

The school has given exceptional results in the academic sphere and its students have excelled in extra co-curricular activities. The percentage of students passing the exam is 100% with 78% scoring first grade.
