= Nambiar =

Nambiar may refer to:

- Nambiar (caste surname), a surname used by multiple caste groups
- Nambiar (Ambalavasi caste), a surname of Pushpaka Brahmin from Kerala, India
- Nambiar (Nair subcaste), a surname of Nair from North Malabar, India

== People ==
- A. C. N. Nambiar (1896–1986), Indian nationalist and first Indian ambassador to Germany
- Aneil Nambiar (born 1984), Indian cricketer
- Ayillyath Kuttiari Gopalan Nambiar (1904–1977), known as AKG, Indian Communist leader
- Balan Nambiar (born 1937), Indian artist, chairman of Lalit Kala Akademi
- Bejoy Nambiar (born 1979), Indian writer, director, and producer
- Lt Gen Chenicheri Satish Nambiar (born 1936), recipient of a Vir Chakra and Force Commander of UNPROFOR
- Chenicheri Vijay K. Nambiar (born 1943), UN official, top aide to Secretary General Ban Ki-moon
- Kalakkaththu Kunchan Nambiar (1705–1770), Malayali poet
- K. Ananda Nambiar (1918–1991), Indian politician
- Kannavath Sankaran Nambiar (1760–1801), prime minister of Pazhassi Raja
- Mahima Nambiar, Indian actress who has appeared in Tamil and Malayalam films
- M. N. Nambiar (1919–2008), Indian Tamil film actor
- O. M. Nambiar (born 1932), Indian athletics coach
- Parvathy Nambiar, South Indian actress and dancer known for her work in Malayalam Cinema
- P. K. Venugopalan Nambiar (1924–1996), Indian agricultural scientist
- Raghunath Nambiar, retired officer of the Indian Air Force
- Rahul Nambiar, Indian singer

== Other uses ==
- Nambiyaar, a 2016 Tamil film

== See also ==
- Nambiyar River
- Tamirabarani–Nambiar Link Canal
