= Kalakkad Mundanthurai Tiger Reserve =

Tiger reserve in Tamil Nadu, India

- IUCN category IV (habitat/species management area)
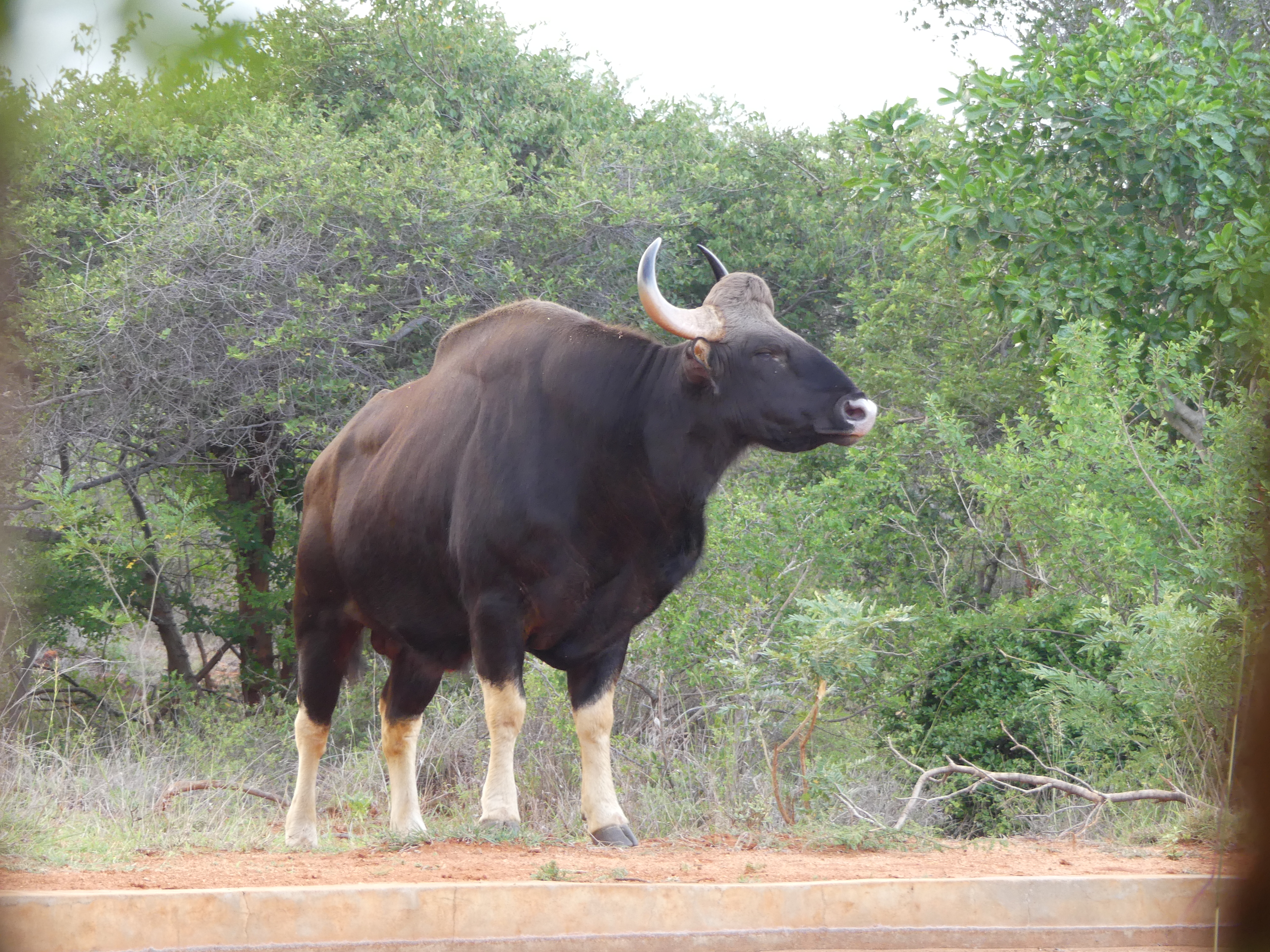
- Gaur in Kalakad Mundanthurai Tiger Reserve

- Location within Tamil Nadu Location within India
- Coordinates: 8°41′N 77°19′E
- Area: 1,601.54 km^{2} (618.36 sq mi)
- Elevation: 1800
- Established: 1988
- Website: kmtr.co.in

Kalakkad Mundanthurai Tiger Reserve is located in the South Western Ghats montane rain forests in Tirunelveli district and Kanyakumari district in the South India. It is the second-largest protected area in Tamil Nadu and part of Agasthyamala Biosphere Reserve.

== History ==
Kalakkad Mundanthurai Tiger Reserve was created in 1988 by combining Kalakad and Mundanthurai Wildlife Sanctuaries, both established in 1962. The notification of parts of Veerapuli and Kilamalai Reserve Forests in adjacent Kanyakumari district added 77 km^{2} (30 sq mi) to the reserve in April 1996, and a 400 km^{2} (150 sq mi) core area has been proposed as a national park.

The continuation of "Project Tiger" in Kalakkad Mundanthurai Tiger Reserve for fiscal year 2010–2011, at the cost of Rs. 19,433,000, was approved by the National Tiger Conservation Authority on 28 August 2010.

== Geography ==
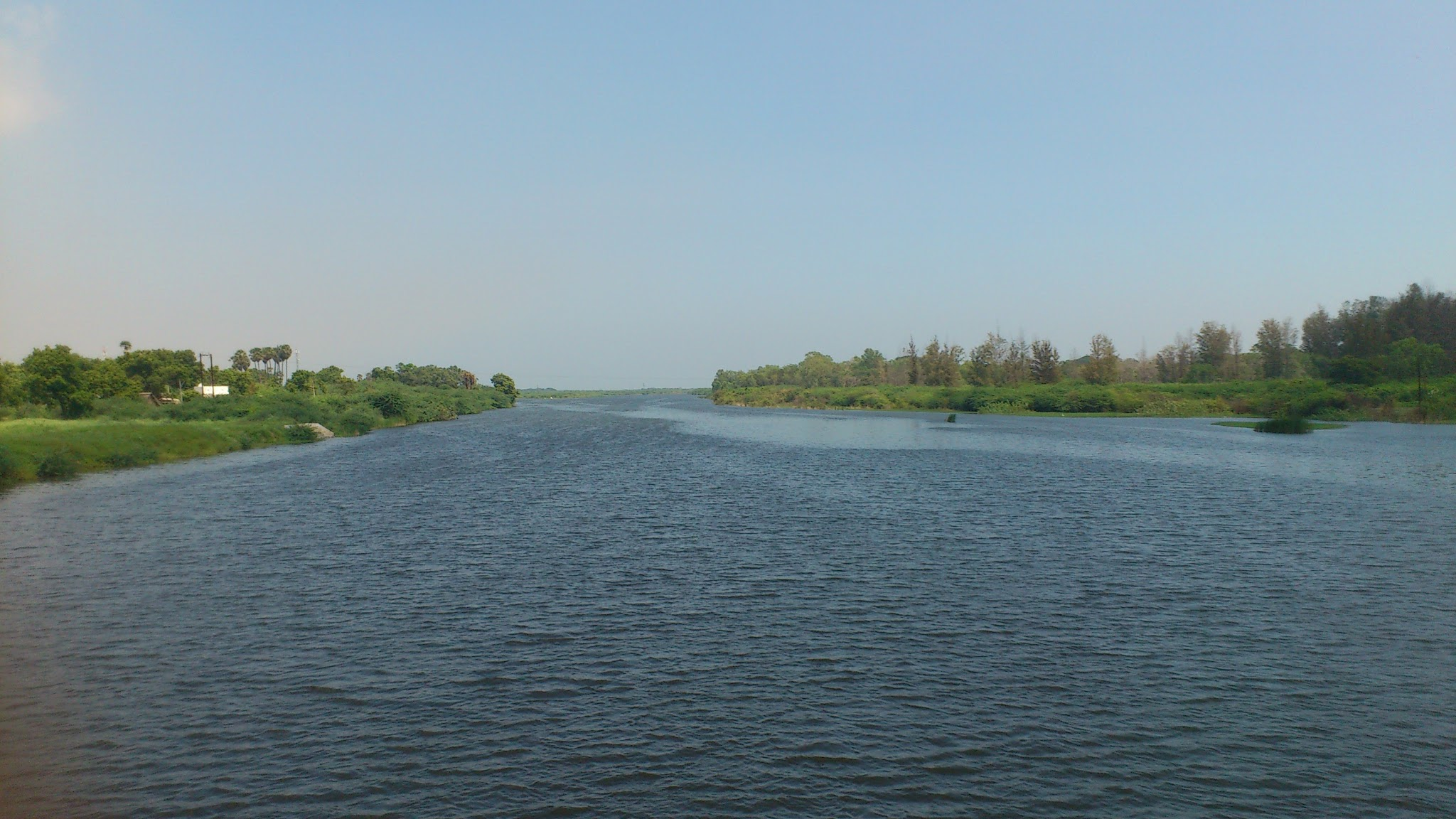
River Thamirabarani

The reserve is located between latitude 8° 25' and 8° 53' N and longitude 77° 10' and 77° 35' E, about 45 km west of Tirunelveli City, and forms the catchment area for 14 rivers and streams. Among these rivers and streams, the Ganga, Thamirabarani, Ramanadi, Karayar, Servalar, Manimuthar, Pachayar, Kodaiyar, Gadananathi River, and Kallar form the backbone of the irrigation network and drinking water for the people of Tirunelveli, Tuticorin and part of Kanyakumari District. Seven major dams—Karaiyar, Lower Dam, Servalar, Manimuthar, Ramanadi, Gadananathi River and Kodaiyar—owe their existence to these rivers.

The reserve spans a range of 40 to 1,800 m in elevation. Agasthiyamalai (1681 m.) is in the core zone of the reserve.

== Conservation ==
Kalakkad Mundanthurai Tiger Reserve forms part of the inter-state Agasthyamalai Biosphere Reserve. This part of Agastya Mala hills in the core of the reserve is considered one of the five centres of biodiversity and endemism in India. The Western Ghats, Agasthyamalai sub-cluster, including all of Kalakkad Mundanthurai Tiger Reserve, was under consideration as a World Heritage Site.

The Ashoka Trust for Research in Ecology and the Environment has developed and implemented a wildlife conservation intervention program in the reserve to decrease local villagers' dependency on the forests for fuel to and build community awareness about the value of biodiversity in the area.

The newsletter "Agasthya" includes updates on research projects and staff activities at Kalakkad Mundanthurai Tiger Reserve. The contents of the first issue included: "A Sanctuary for Cycas circinalis", "Tiger Almost", "Round in Agasthyamalai in Fourteen Days", "Corridors - It is Just Not for the Four Legged Furry Creatures", "Behaviour and Movement of Nilgiri langur in the Upper Kodayar Range – KMTR", "Canopy News", "Agasthya Village Commons and Backyards to Meet the Biomass Requirements: An Experiment with Panchayat Raj and Women Collectives", "Bi-Lingual Field Guide Test Run", "Snippets from the Field", "Cullenia exarillata: A Keystone Species for Birds?" and "Tea, Tiger and Oranges".

== Flora and fauna ==
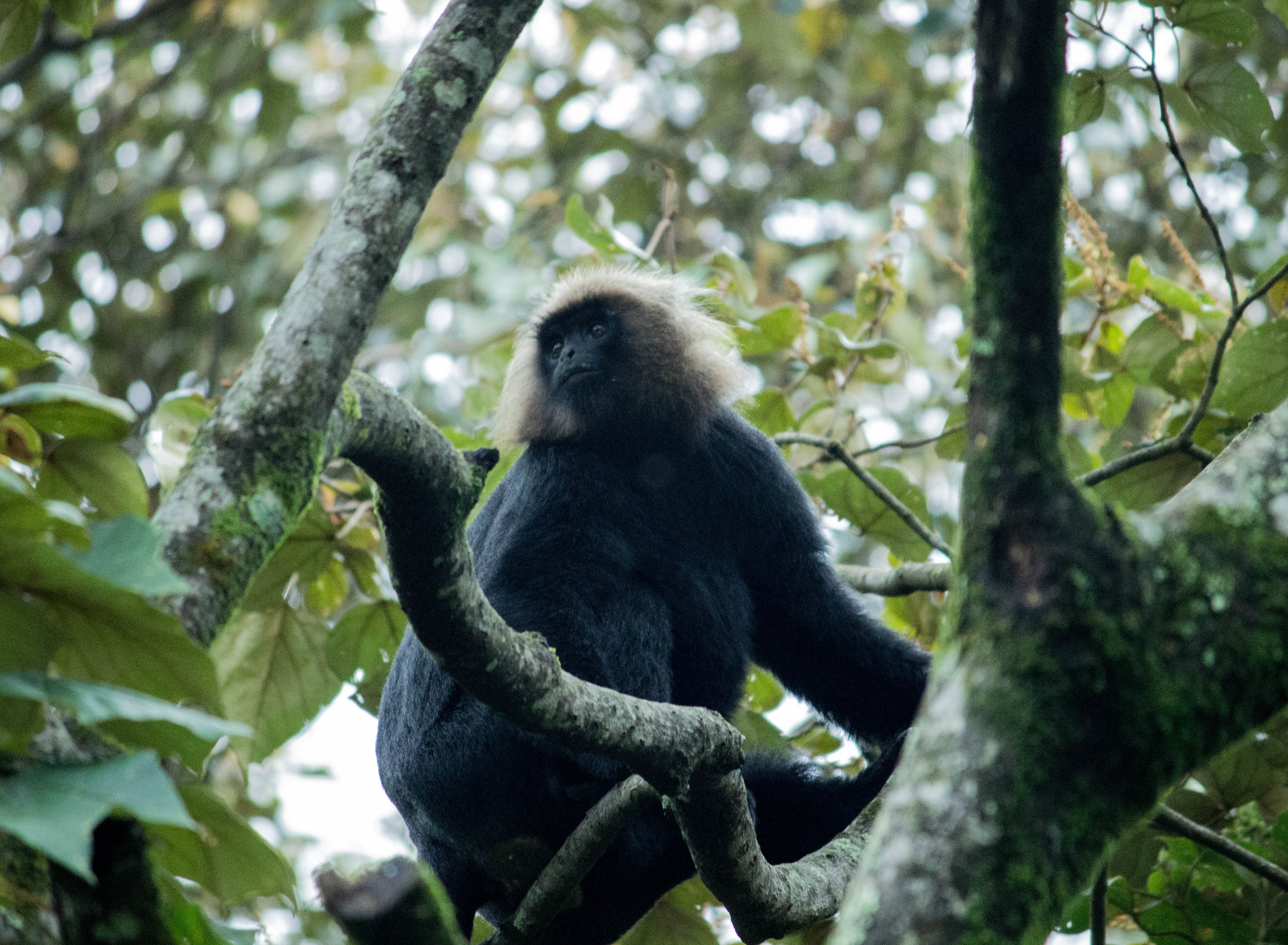
Nilgiri langur in Kalakkad Mundanthurai Tiger Reserve

Forest in Kalakkad Mundanthurai Tiger Reserve

Kalakkad Mundanthurai Tiger Reserve has at least 150 endemic plants, 33 fish, 37 amphibians, 81 reptiles, 273 birds and 77 mammal species.

Habitat use by the grey junglefowl (Gallus sonneratii) at Mundanthurai plateau, Tamil Nadu, was investigated from December 1987 to March 1988.

== Settlements ==
There are several small estates and five Kani tribal habitations, consisting of about 102 families. About 145 hamlets situated within 5 km of the 110 km eastern boundary of the reserve are inhabited by 100,000 people. There are about 50,000 cattle grazing out of these fringe villages, with a small number of cattle owned by the tea estate workers and residents of the electricity board colonies.

On 18 January 2018, the state government passed instructions to the Tirunelveli district collector and the state forest department to notify the entire area that originates at Thamirabarani River as a reserve forest. The state forest department sought the government to convert all tea estate areas leased out to private parties to be brought back under the forest cover. On 12 January 2018, the governor of the state declared new forest boundaries for Kalakad and Mundanthurai that caters water to five southern districts. Kalakkad Mundanthurai Tiger Reserve has a large number of employees of the Electricity Board and Public Works Department who stay in three colonies and work at Karayar, Upper Dam, Servalar and Upper Kodayar reservoirs within the reserve. Bombay Burmah Trading Corporation has a 33.88 km^{2} (13.08 sq mi) land in the core area of the reserve leased from singampatti zamin valid until 2028. The company has tea and coffee plantations and three factories, and employs about 10,000 workers in the reserve.

== See also ==
- Tiger reserves of India
