= Tamirabarani–Nambiar Link Canal =

River in India

Tamirabarani–Nambiar Link Canal is a proposed canal in the south Indian state of Tamil Nadu which will link Tamirabarani, Karumeniyar and Nambiyar rivers. Tamil Nadu depends heavily on water from the rivers originating from the neighbouring states of Kerala and Karnataka. The state government has envisioned a project which should potentially benefit the drier regions of the Tirunelveli and Tuticorin districts of the state. The project is expected to use the 13,000 mcft surplus water in Tamirabarani river.

== Project ==
6,038 hectares of land will benefit by irrigation and 17,002 hectares of land will benefit from the ground water being recharged. 694 hectares of land will be acquired from Tirunelveli district and 106 hectares will be acquired from Tuticorin district for the implementation of the project.

== Route ==
The water will be diverted from Tamirabarani river at the third anaicut at the confluence of Manimutharu and Papanasam rivers through the existing Kannadian canal for about 37 km. A new barrage will be constructed 6.4 km downstream to divert the water further which will be linked with Kannadian canal and the new canal will run for about 73 km till it reaches Thisayanvilai near to the Gulf of Mannar. A barrage of several small interlinking canal across this canal is additionally expected to benefit more land.

== See also ==
Sethu Canal
