= Kulashekharanatha Mahalingam Temple, Pathai =

Coordinates: 8.53353°N 77.54756°E

Kulashekharanatha Mahalingam Temple is located in the village of Pathai, in the district of Tirunelveli, in the state of Tamil Nadu, in India.

== Pathai Village ==
The village of Pathai is located on the foothills of the Western Ghats range of mountains in the south of India, in the state of Tamil Nadu. It is located near the town of Kalakkad and is about 58 km from Kanyakumari (Cape Comorin). The village is on the banks of the river - Pachaiyar (the green river/shyama Nadi in Sanskrit language). The village has temples dedicated to Lord Vasudeva, Lord Kulashekhara Mahalingam and Goddess Kulashekhara Nangai apart from many smaller shrines.

The location in Google maps is Pathai Village

== Kulashekharanatha Mahalingam Temple ==
The Kulashekharanatha Mahalingam temple is the ancient Shiva temple of the village of Pathai. The presiding deity of the temple is Shiva with the name - Kulashekharanatha Mahalingam with His consort — Devi Sugandha Kuntalambika (Mattuvarkuzhali in Tamil language). The Devi shrine is in a separate sanctorum. The Shiva Mahalingam is unique with five-faced as is the Lord Himself.

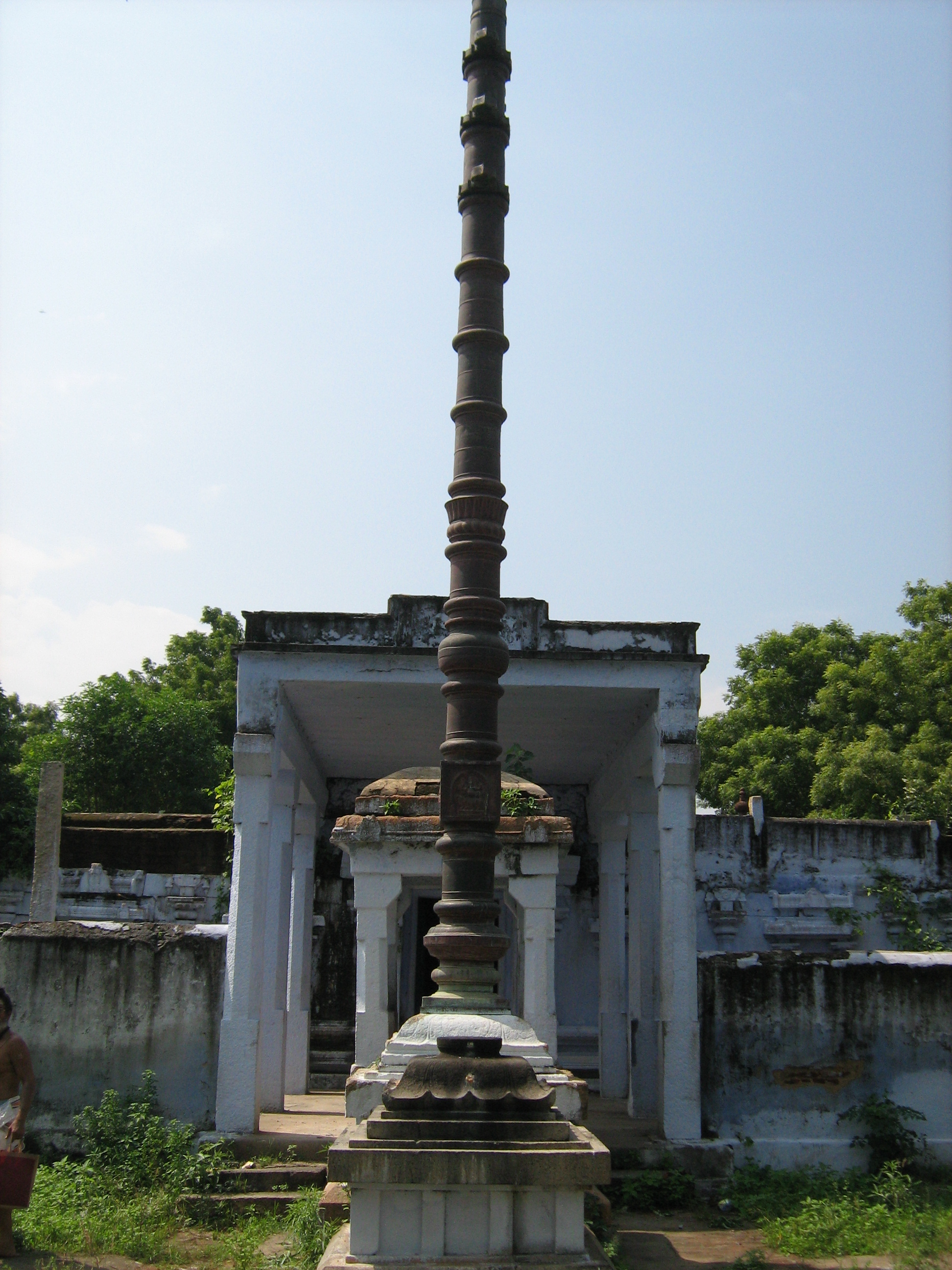
Main entrance showing Bali Peeta, Dwajasthambha and Nandi Mantapa

Apart from the main deities, there are separate shrines for Shri Ganapathy, Subrahmanya with His consorts - ShriValli and Devasena, Chandikeshwara, Shanaischara (Shani/Saturn God)and Kalabhairava on the outer corridor or the prakaram(outer courtyard) around the main Sanctorum. Dakshinamurthy or the South facing Universal Teacher avatar of Shiva is on the south side of the outer wall of the Sanctum Sanctorum of the main deity as per the tradition.

An intricately carved Nandhi or the Sacred Bull, the divine mount of Lord Shiva, sits facing the main deity — Kulashekharanatha Mahalingam.

Another Shiva Lingam is present in a separate shrine near the main deity in the temple proper. This God is known by the name - Tripurahareshwara with His consort - Tripurasundari in a separate neighboring sanctum. These two shrines are located at a slightly lower level than the plinth of the main Sanctum Sanctorum and hence is known by the name - Pallathudayar in the Tamil language, meaning the one in lower level. This Lord is known to bless copious rains in the area when his Sanctum is filled with water and offered special prayers even in the severe droughts.

The Dwajasthambham or the Flag pole, unique with a Nandhi at its apex, stands at the main entrance as is the tradition.

== History of the Temple ==
The temple is a unique blend of the three major regional influence — the three major rulers of the South India - Chera dynasty — as the Lord is known as the Lord of King Kulashekhara (Kulashekhara Natha) - Chola dynasty — the Goddess is known by the same name - Sugandha Kuntalambika - the Consort of Lord Matrubhuteshwara at Tiruchchirapalli in the heart of Chola land - Pandya dynasty — the temple located in the Pandya land with its unique architectural style.

The Sthalapurana, or the history of the place, indicates that Lord Rama visited this temple en route to Lanka in search of His wife Sita.

Local mythology says that the temple was covered in the forest in later years only to be discovered by a local ruler when a cow fell at the spot of the Lingam submerged in the land. When his men were clearing the area, hit something similar to a stone with his pick axe, resulting in blood gushing from it. The Lingam was found there and the local ruler built a temple, which transformed over the period of time to the present state.

== Present state of the Temple ==
The Temple has many inscriptions on the walls waiting to be studied by the scholars to understand the history of the temple and of the shrine.

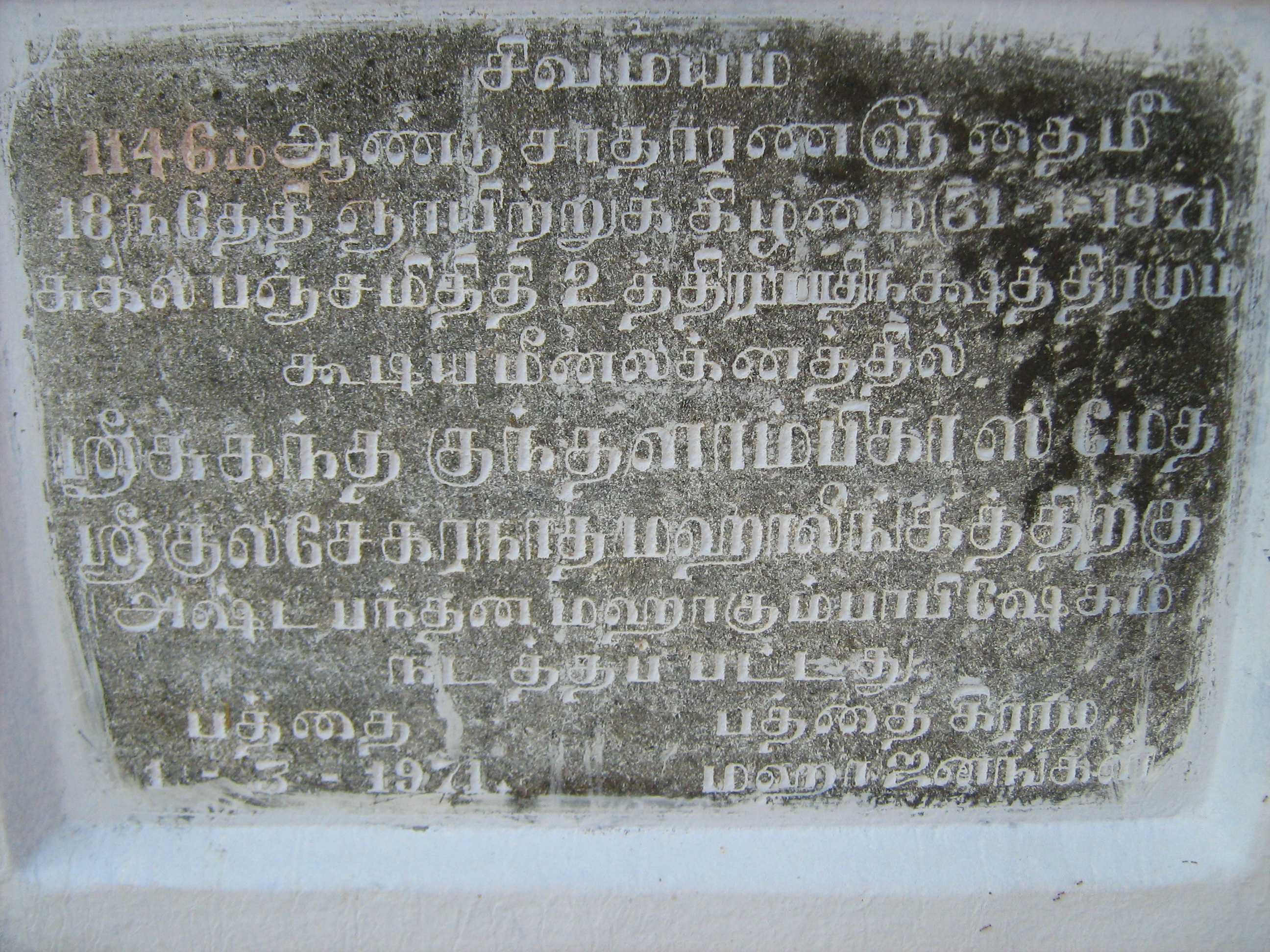
Kumbhabhishekam/Consecration 31 January 1971 AD inscribed on the wall

The latest inscription near the entrance after the Nandi Mantapa informs of the Consecration or the Kumbhabhishekam done on 31 January 1971 AD by the citizens of Pathai village.

There are several Vahanam or the divine mounts in the temple indicating the festivals in the past with pomp and glory, but now in dilapidated condition. The processional idols or the Utsava vigraha are now kept in the Nellaiappar Temple in Tirunelveli, after a foiled theft attempt, for safe-keeping.

With most of the young generation of the village moved out for occupation, the temple is in a very dilapidated condition, putting up a heart-rending picture with trees, weeds and plants growing on the temple structure, posing a severe danger of pulling it down.

Present dilapidated state of the Temple
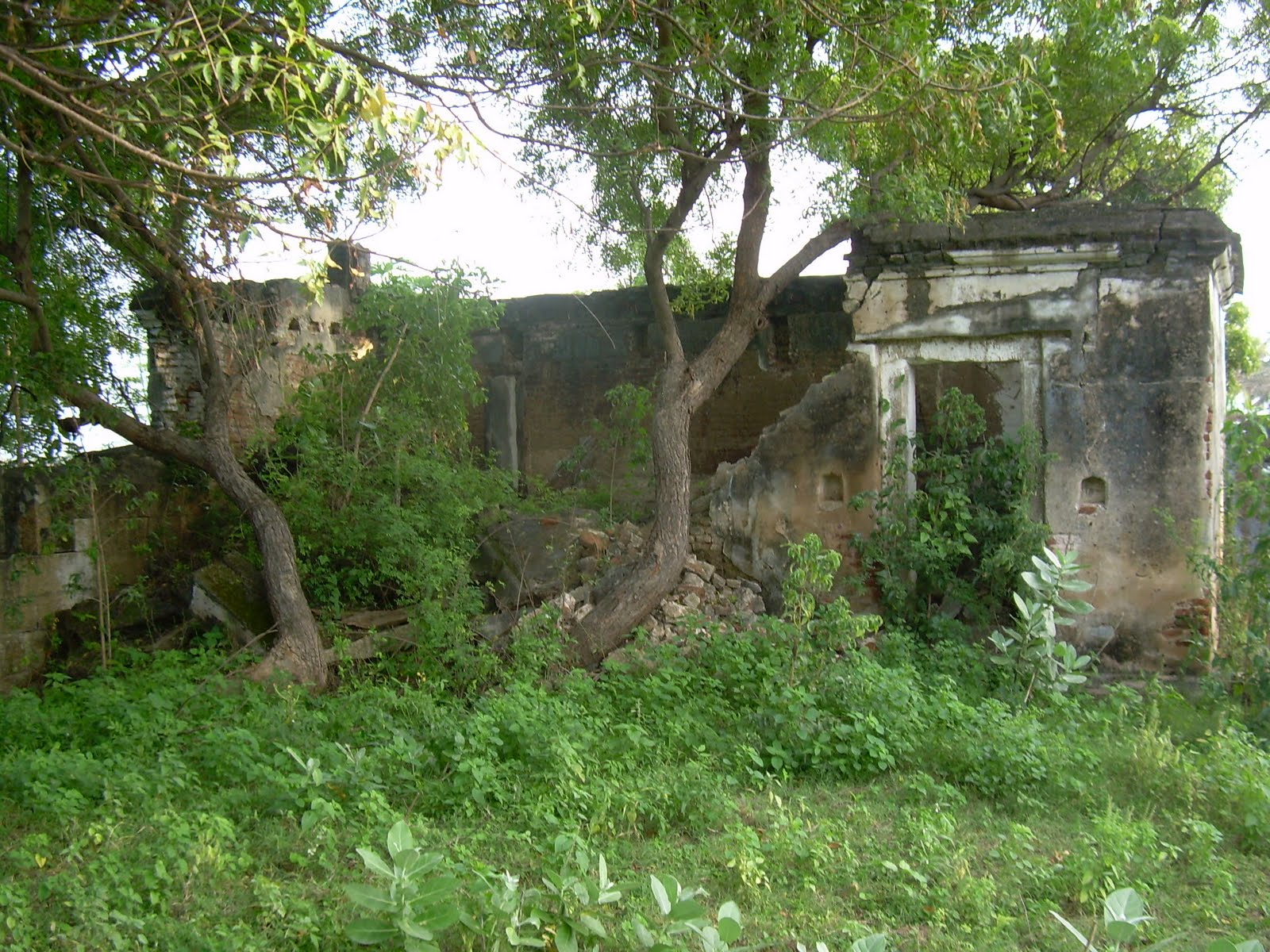
A room within the Temple premises destroyed by trees and plants

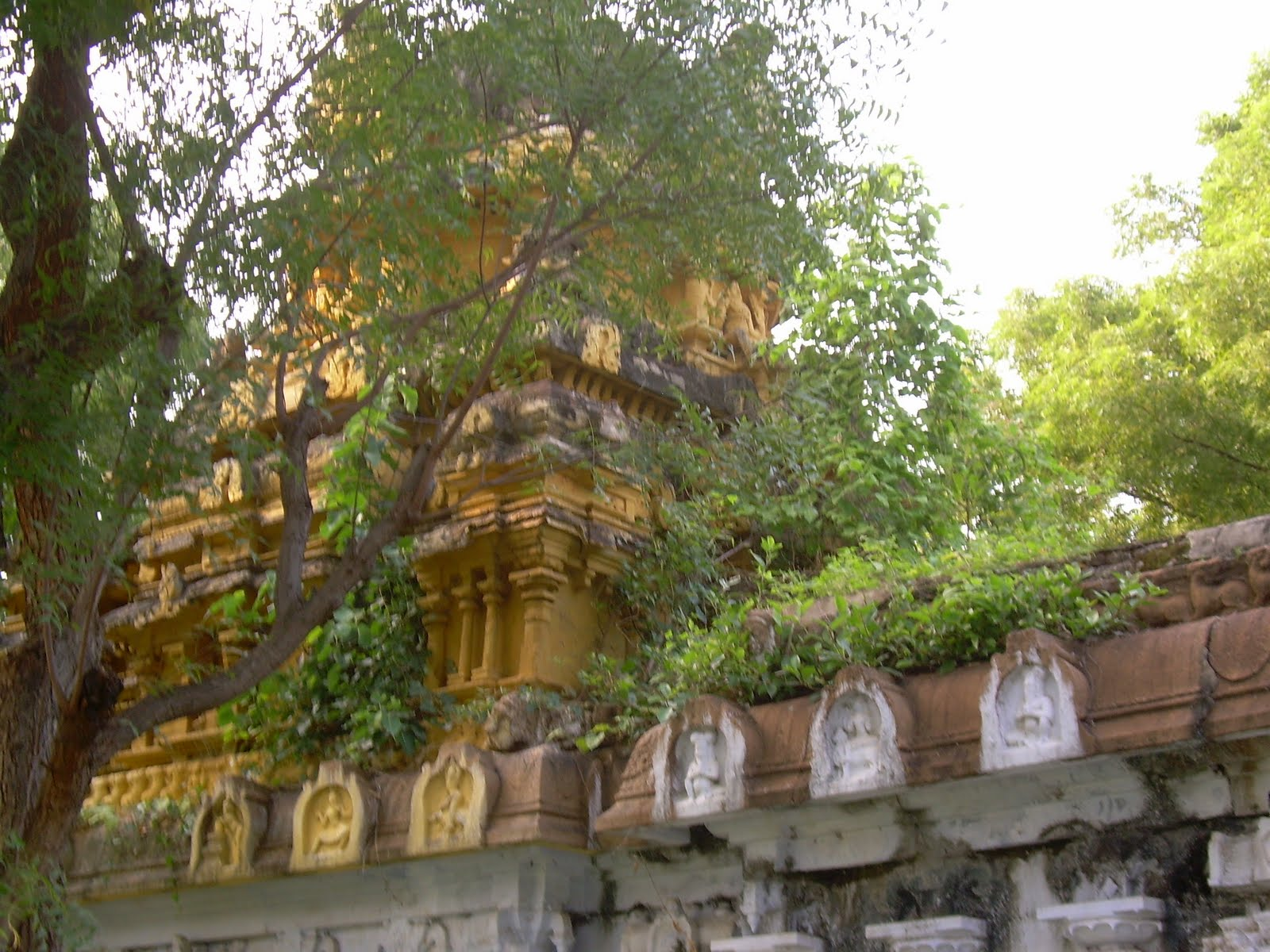
Main Sanctorum of Shiva with plant growth on it

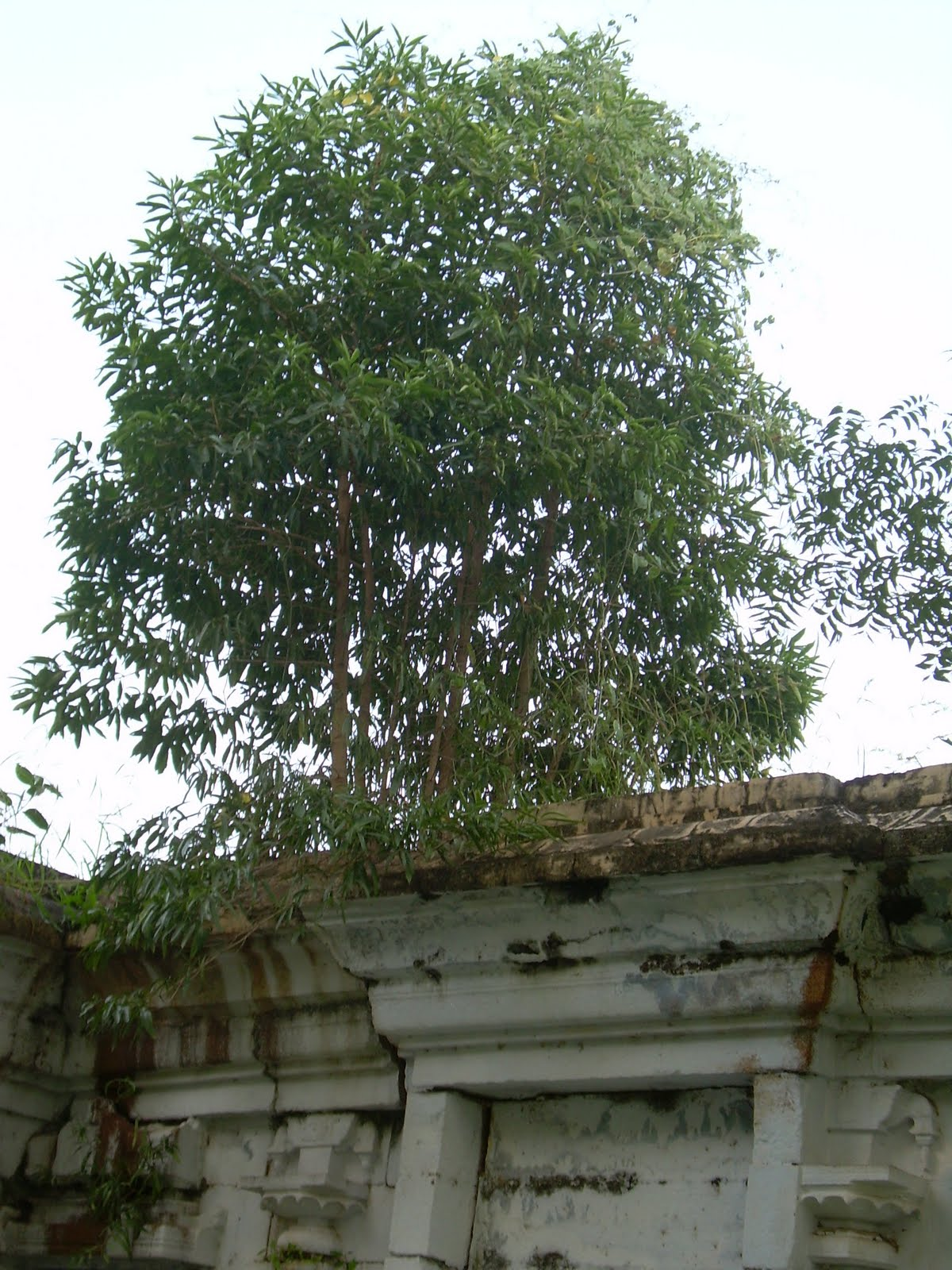
A Side wall with tree growth

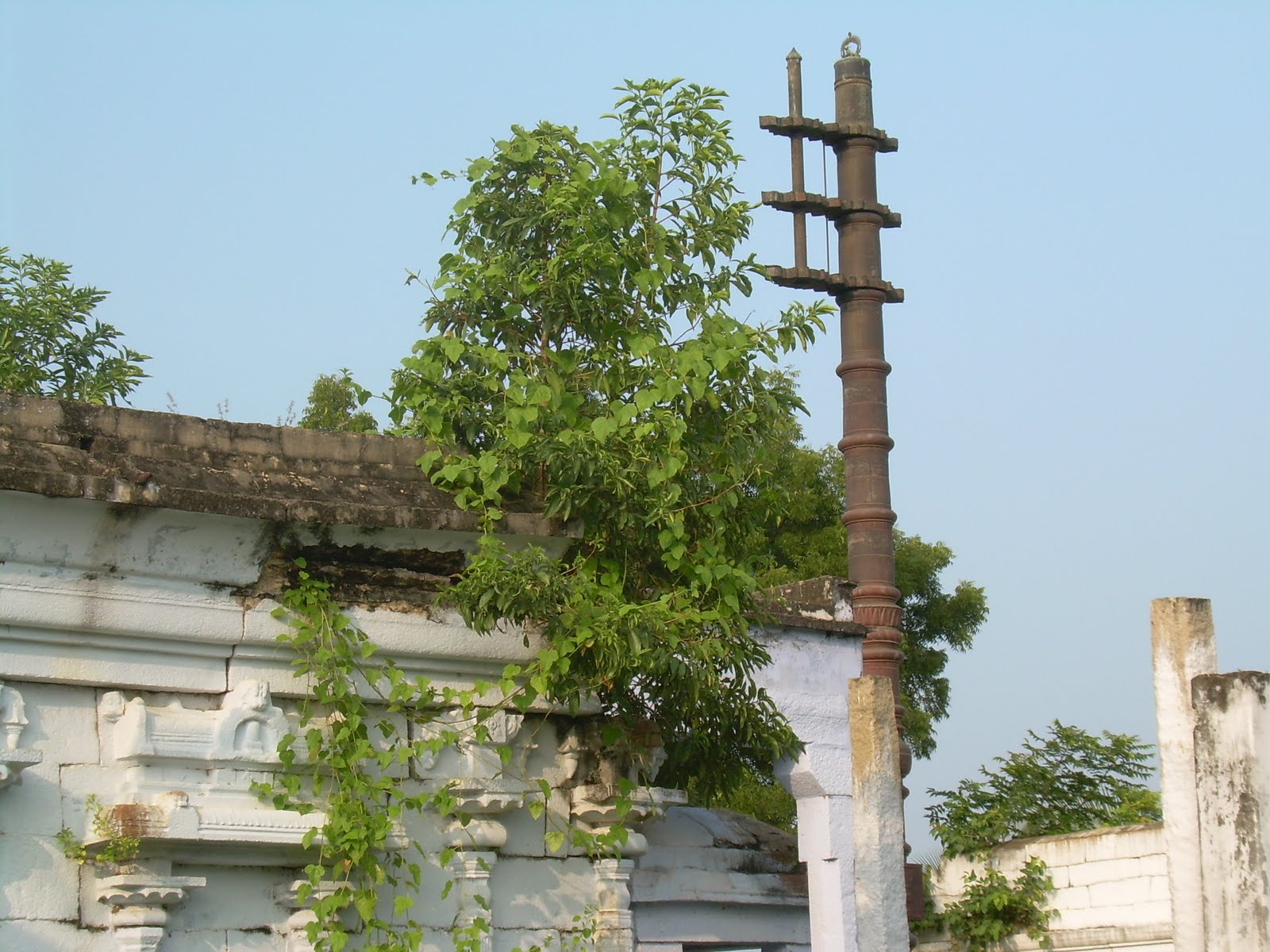
Side view showing Dhwajasthambham and wall with plants growing on it

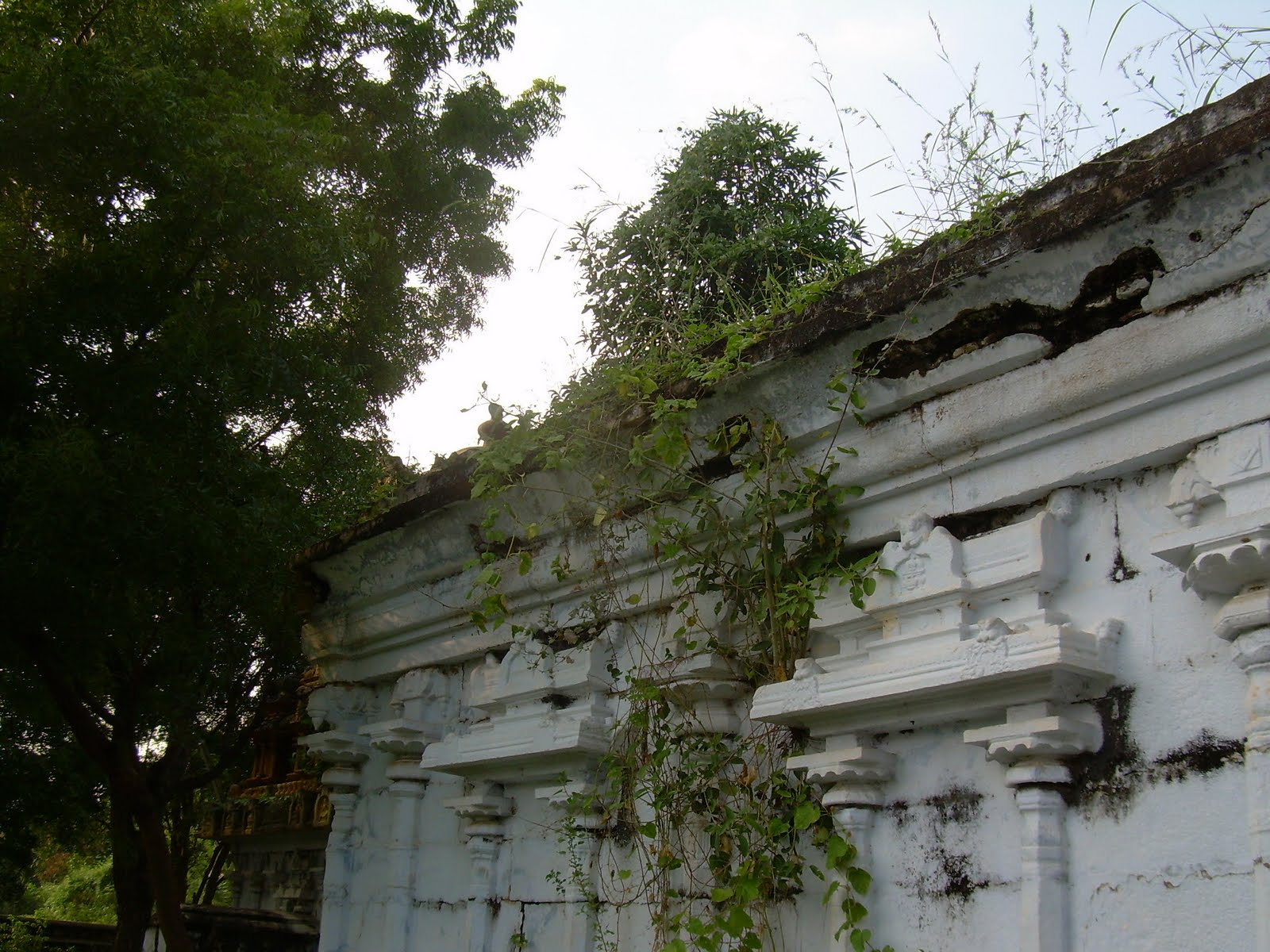
Southern wall of the main shrine damaged by plants

Worship is offered once a day by the priest coming from a neighboring place. Village manages to offer the Pradosham Puja/offering without fail. (The Thirteenth Evening twilight after the new moon, is considered is a very holy and auspicious day for the worship of Lord Shiva.)

== Efforts for renaissance ==
People who have their nativity in this village, now spread all over the world and many parts within India, have started a forum - Kulasekara Nathar Devotees Forum - in a bid to revive the glory of the Temple — as a way of giving back to their native society.
