= Kavisigamuwa =

Kavisigamuwa is a village in Kurunegala District in the North Western Province of Sri Lanka. Kavisigamuwa is famous for the Deduru Oya anicut. Sri Gamini Central College is situated in Kavisigamuwa.
