= Perungulam =

- Town
- Location in Tamil Nadu, India
- Coordinates: 8°38′53″N 77°59′57″E
- Country: India
- State: Tamil Nadu
- District: Thoothukudi

Population (2001)
  - Total: 6,451

Languages
  - Official: Tamil
- Time zone: UTC+5:30 (IST)

Perungulam is a panchayat town in Thoothukudi district in the Indian state of Tamil Nadu.

== Demographics ==
As of the 2001 India census, Perungulam had a population of 6,451. Males constitute 49% of the population and females 51%. Perungulam has an average literacy rate of 77%, higher than the national average of 59.5%: male literacy is 81%, and female literacy is 74%. 12% of the population is under 6 years of age.

== Landmark ==
=== Srinivasa Perumal Temple ===
Sri Mayakoothar Temple - Thirukkulandhai, Perunkulam is one of the Nava Tirupathi, nine Hindu temples dedicated to Vishnu located along the Tiruchendur-Tirunelveli route, on the banks of Thamiraparani river. These temples are classified as "Divya Desams", the 108 temples of Vishnu revered by the 12 poet saints, or Alwars.
