= Srinivasa Perumal Temple, Tirukulandhai =

Perumal temple in Thoothukudi district Tamil Nadu, India

Sri Srinivasa Perumal Temple
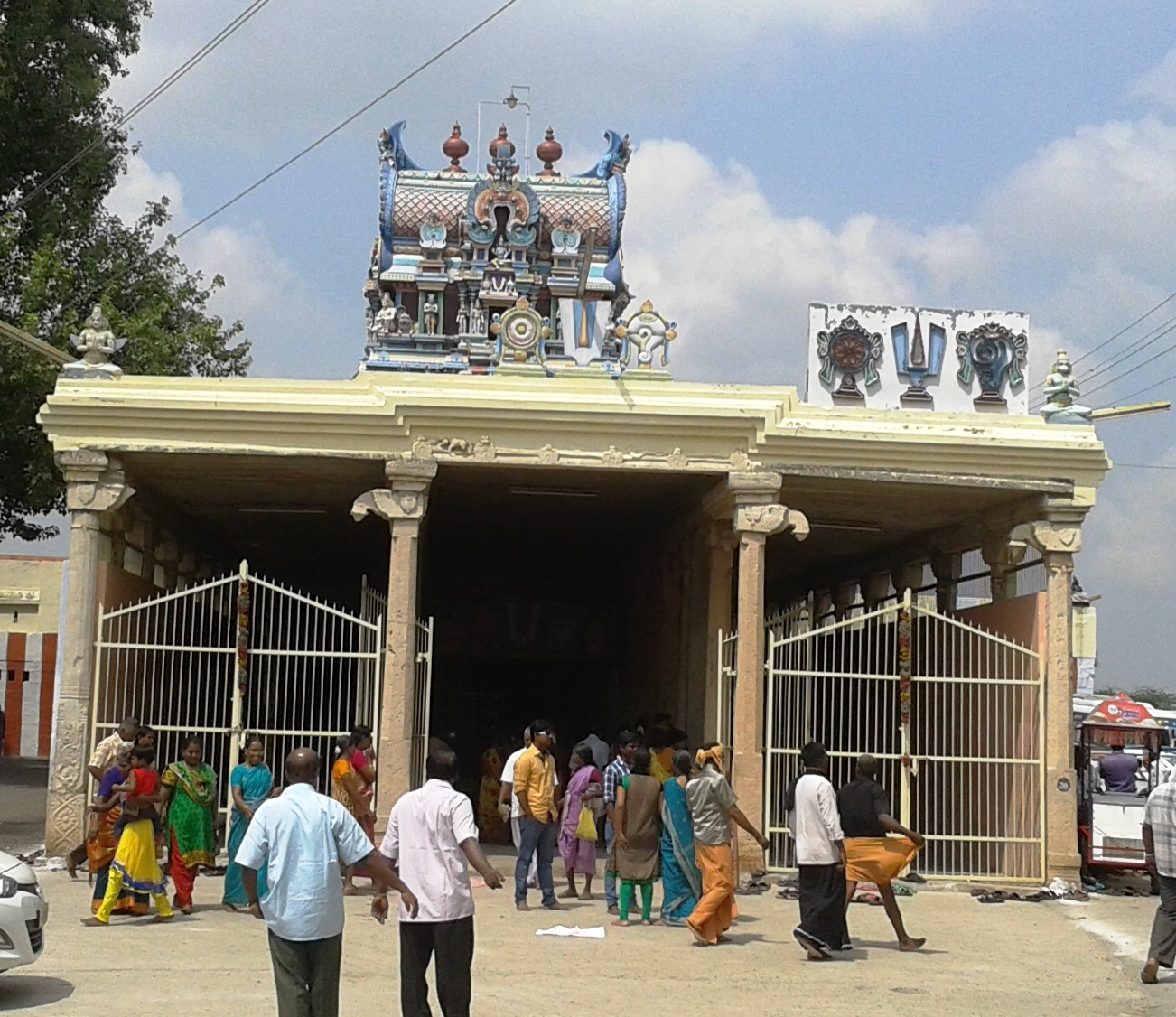

- Location in Tamil Nadu

Religion
- Affiliation: Hinduism
- District: Tuticorin
- Deity: Srinivasa Perumal (Vishnu) Alamelu Mangai Tayar (Lakshmi) Mayakoothan; Vishnu
- Features: Tower: Ananda Nilaya; Temple tank: Perungulam

Location
- Location: Perungulam
- State: Tamil Nadu
- Country: India
- Coordinates: 8°38′30.5″N 77°59′38.2″E

Architecture
- Type: Dravidian architecture
- Elevation: 34 m (112 ft)

Sri Srinivasa Perumal Temple or Sri Mayakoothar Permual Temple is one of the Nava Tirupatis, nine Hindu temples dedicated to Vishnu located Perungulam along Tiruchendur-Tirunelveli route, Tamil Nadu, India in the southern bank of Thamiraparani river. It is located 5 km from Alvar Thirunagari. All these 9 temples are classified as Divya Desams, the 108 temples of Vishnu revered by the 12 poet-saints of Sri Vaishnavism called the Alvars. The temple is referred to as Shani sthalam, a location for the planet deity, Shani (Saturn). Constructed in the Dravidian style of architecture, the temple is glorified in the Nalayira Divya Prabandham, the early medieval Tamil canon of the Alvar saints from the 6th–9th centuries CE. It is one of the 108 Divya Desams dedicated to Vishnu, who is worshipped as Mayakoothar and his consort Lakshmi as Kulandhaivalli Tayar.

A granite wall surrounds the temple, enclosing all its shrines. The rajagopuram, the temple's gateway tower, is three-tiered in structure. The temple follows the Tenkalai tradition of worship. The temple is maintained and administered by the Hindu Religious and Endowment Board of the Government of Tamil Nadu.

== Legend ==
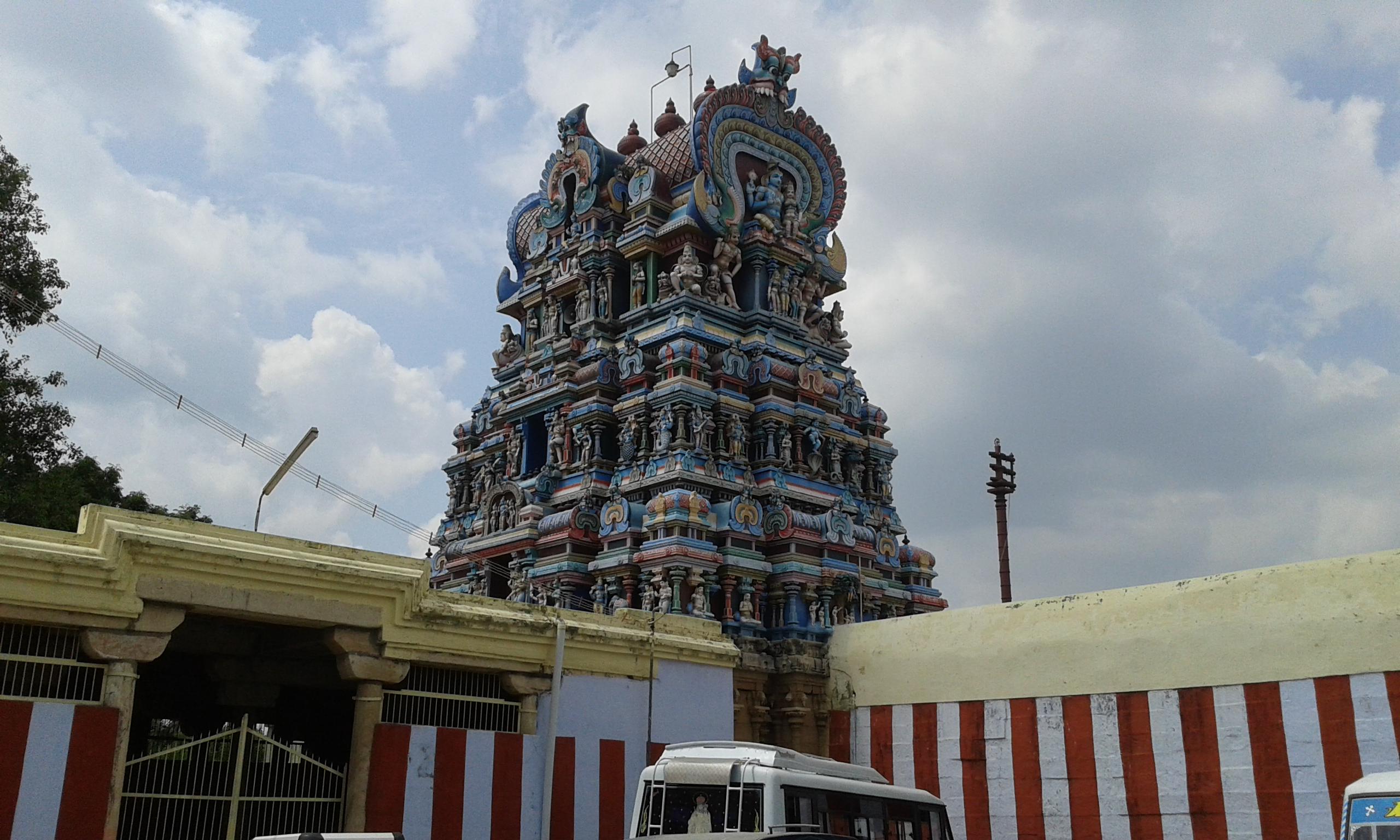
Image of the gopuram

This temple history describes Vishnu's power to perform miracles to serve his devotees. Once one asura abducted Vishnu devotee named Vedasaran's wife Kumudhavalli. The asura performed magic tricks but was vanquished by Vishnu who danced on his head as Koothar. And he restored Kumudhavalli to her husband. As per another legend, a childless couple named Devasaran and Kumudavalli were residing at a forest named Thadakavanam near Tholavallimangalam. On account of their devotion to Vishnu, they got a girl named Kamaladevi. Kamala was also a very ardent devotee and started doing penance. In spite of many convincing her against it, she was firm and wanted to attain Vishnu as her husband. Since a small girl performed penance at this place, the place came to be known as Palikavanam. From then, the place came to be known as Thirukulanthai.

== Architecture ==
The temple has two prakarams (closed precincts of a temple). The temple has an image of Vishu facing east direction. Kulam refers to tank in Tamil language. The name of the village is derived from the same. The temple is located in Tiruchendur-Tirunelveli route, Tamil Nadu, India in the banks of Thamiraparani river, in the South Indian state of Tamil Nadu. The temple is constructed in Dravidian style of architecture. All the shrines of the temple are located in a rectangular granite walls, pierced by a three-tiered gopuram. The presiding deity is sported in a sitting posture with Sridevi and Bhudevi on either of his sides. The images of Bhudevi and Sridevi along with the festival images are located inside the sanctum. Since Garuda helped Vishnu in the war, he is always sported carrying both Vishnu and Lakshmi. In modern times, the temple is maintained and administered by the Hindu Religious and Endowment Board of the Government of Tamil Nadu. The temple is one of the places where Vishnu has four consorts namely Sridevi, Bhudevi, Niladevi, and Kamaladevi.

== Festival and religious practices ==
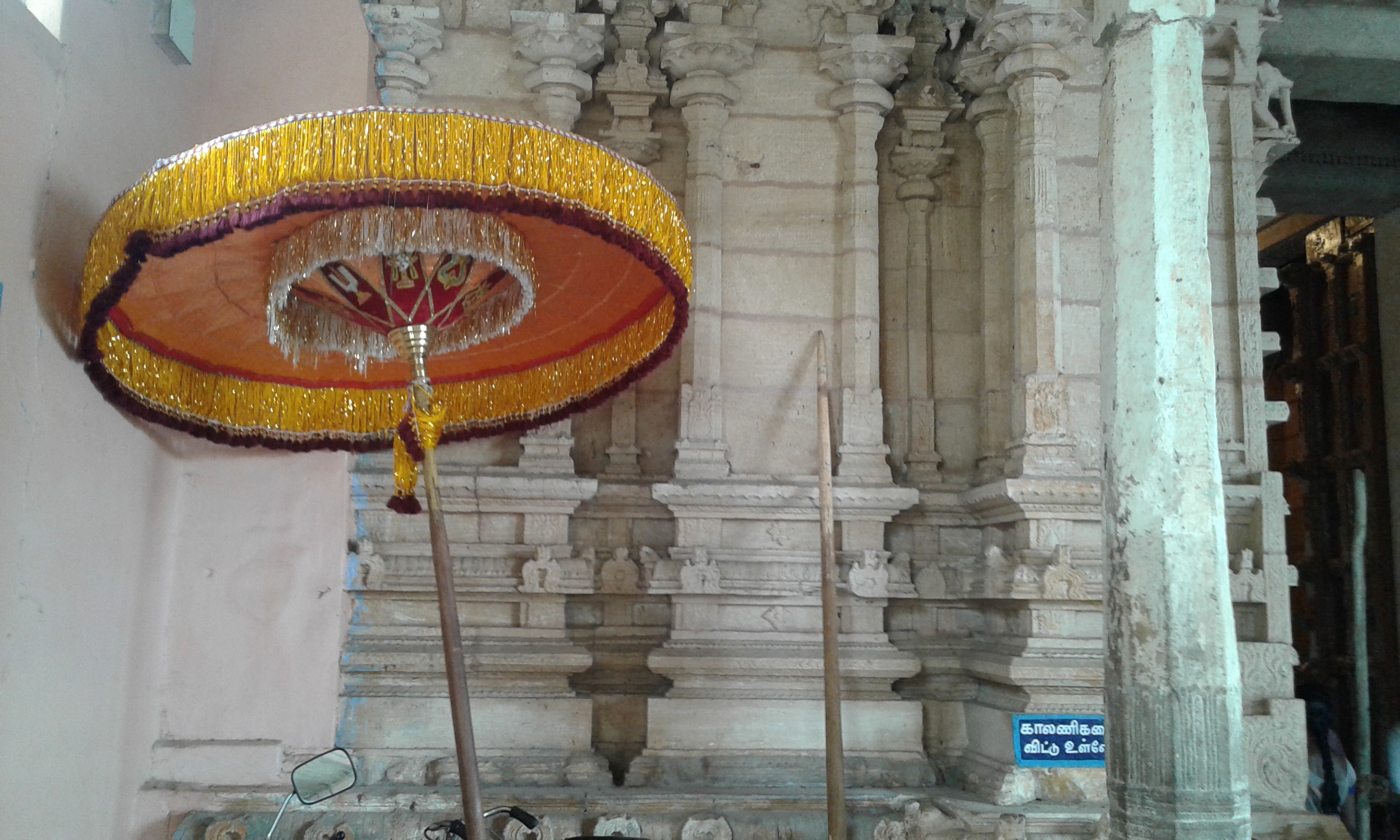
Temple umbrella

The Garuda Sevai utsavam (festival) in the month of Vaikasi (May-Jun) witnesses 9 Garudasevai, a spectacular event in which festival image idols from the Nava Tirupatis shrines in the area are brought on Garuda vahana (sacred vehicle). An idol of Nammalvar is also brought here on an Anna Vahanam (palanquin) and his pasurams (verses) dedicated to each of these 9 temples are recited. The utsavar (festival deity) of Nammalvar is taken in a palanquin to each of the 9 temples, through the paddy fields in the area. The pasurams (poems) dedicated to each of the 9 Divyadesams are chanted in the respective shrines. This is the most important of the festivals in this area, and it draws thousands of visitors.

== Religious significance ==
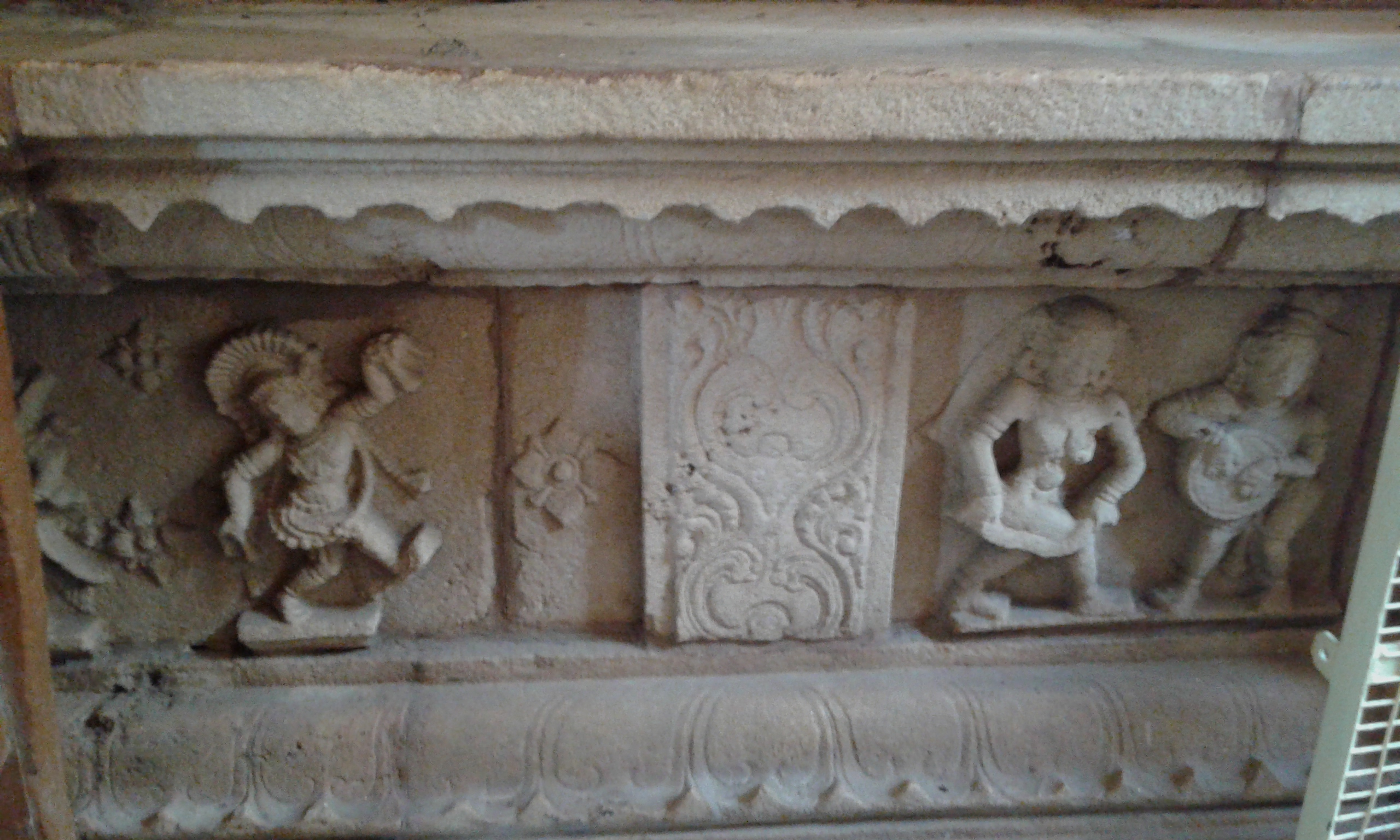
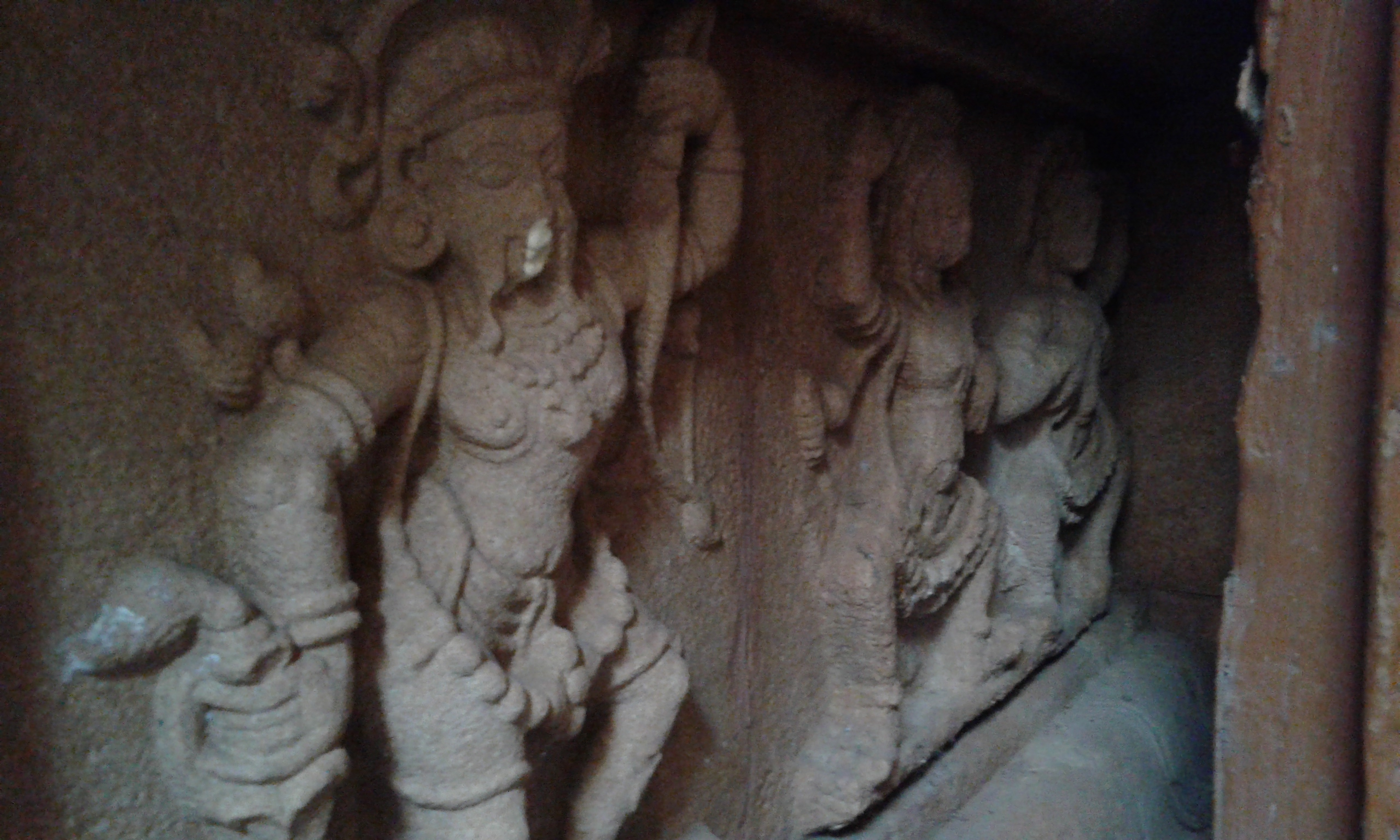
Sculpture in the temple

The Brahmanda Purana one of the eighteen sacred texts of Hinduism written by Veda Vyasa contains a chapter called Navathirupathi Mahatmeeyam. Vaikunta Mahatmeeyam is another work in Sanskrit that glorifies the temple and is a part of Tamraparani Sthalapurana available only in palm manuscripts. The temple is revered in Nalayira Divya Prabandham, the 7th–9th century Vaishnava canon, by Nammalvar. The temple is classified as a Divya Desam, one of the 108 Vishnu temples that are mentioned in the book. Nammalvar makes a reference about the temple in his works in his Tiruvaymoli. During the 18th and 19th centuries, the temple finds mention in several works like 108 Tirupati Antati by Divya Kavi Pillai Perumal Aiyangar. The temple also forms a series of Navagraha temples where each of the nine planetary deities of one of the temples of Nava Tirupati. The temple is associated with the planet Shani (Saturn).
