= Manimuthar River (tributary of Thamirabarani) =

River in Tamil Nadu, India

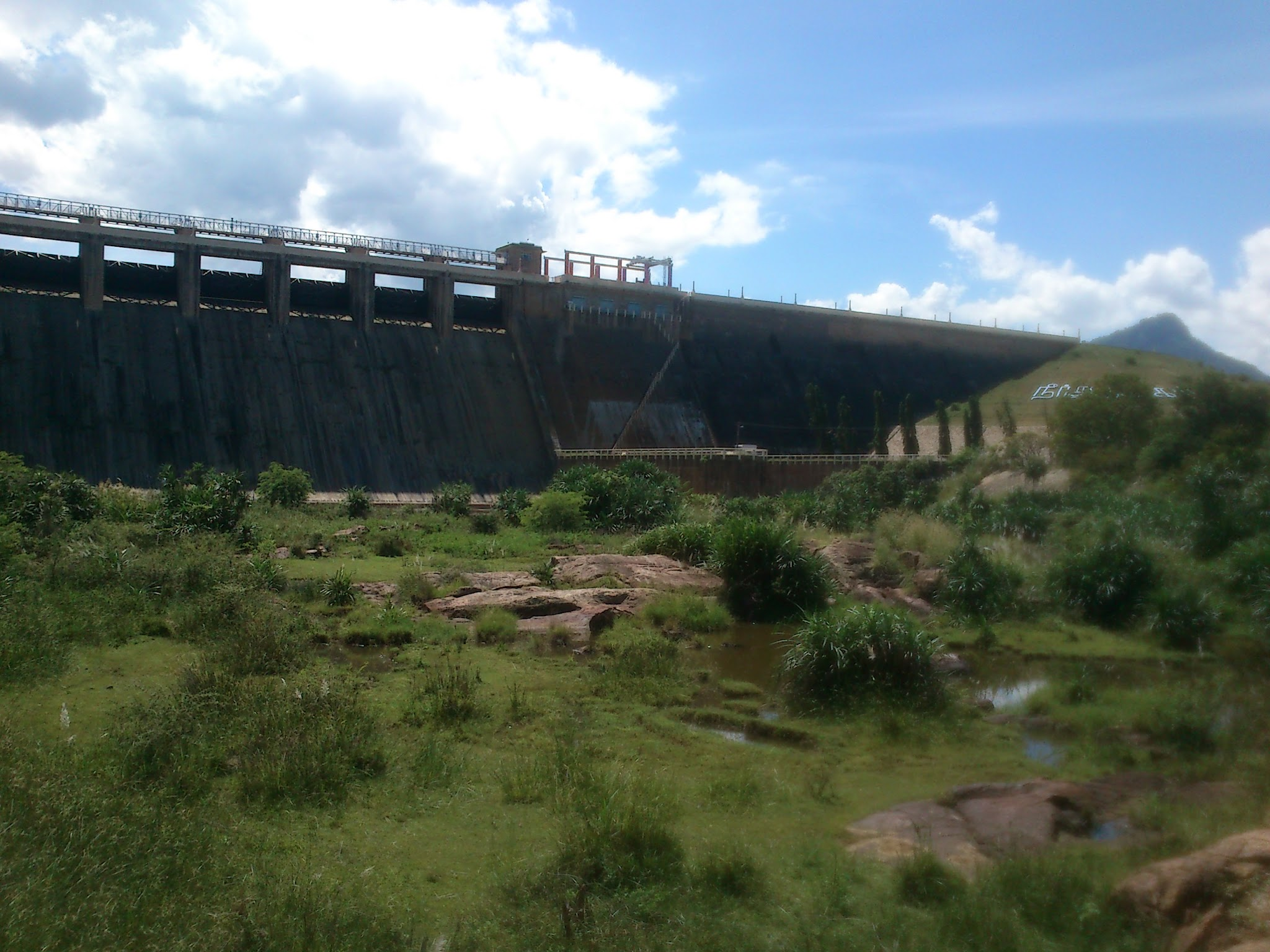
Manimuthar dam

Manimuthar River originates on the eastern slopes of Western Ghats in Tirunelveli District of the state of Tamil Nadu in southern India. It is a major tributary of the Thamirabarani River.

The river begins in the dense forest on a mountain peak 1,300 metres (4,300 ft) above sea level in Ex-Singampatti Zamindari, Ambasamudram taluk and flows 9 kilometres (6 mi) though small cataracts until it reaches the Tambaraparani River near Kallidaikurichi.

The tributaries of the Manimuthar are the Keezha River and the Varattar River. As a tributary, the Manimuther River adds a considerable amount of water to the Tamiraparani River as it seasonally is always in full.

In 1957, Manimuthar anicut was built across the river 3 kilometres (2 mi) before its juncture with the Tamiraparani.

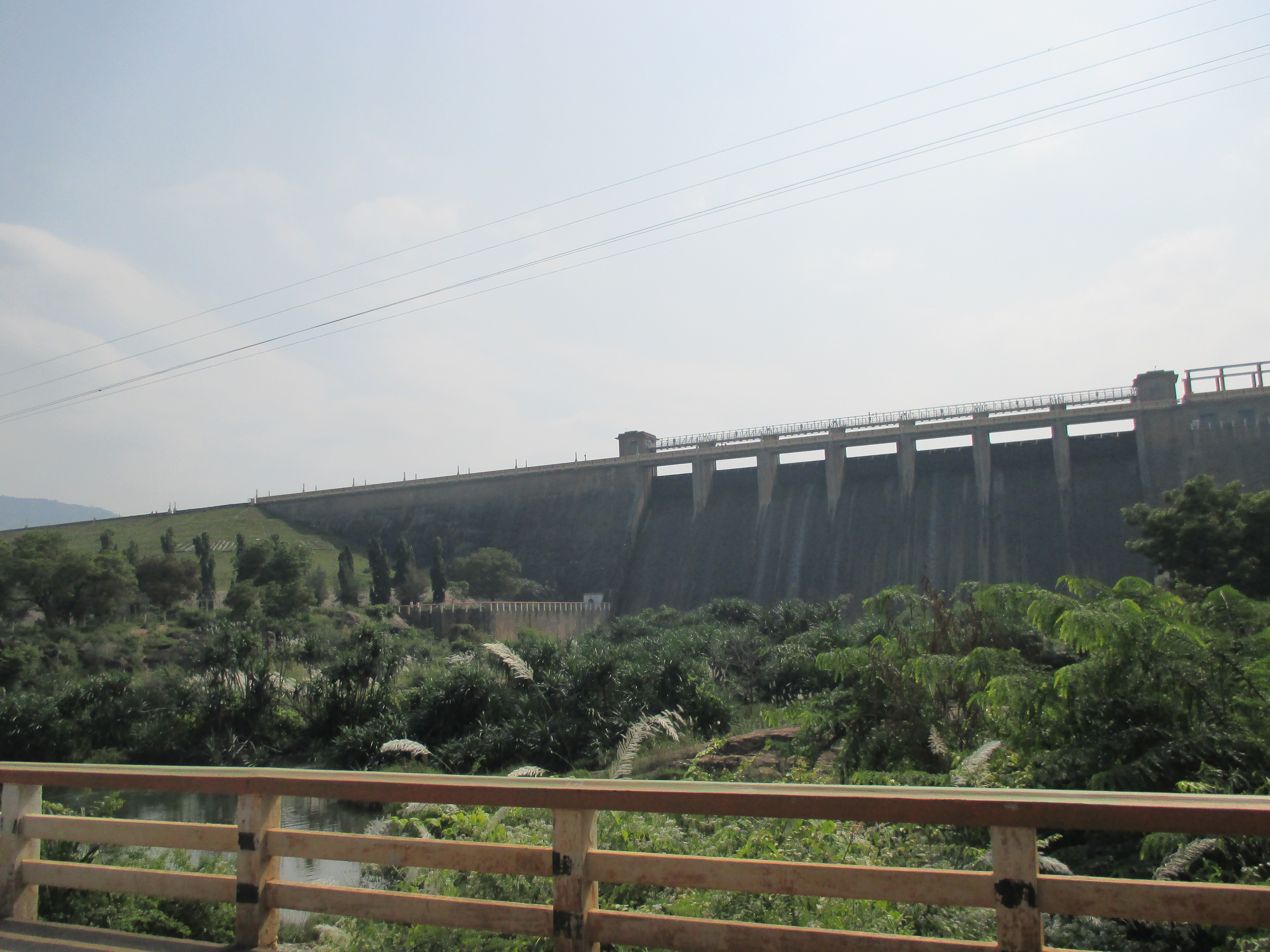
Spillway of Manimuthar anicut

== Manjolai Hills ==
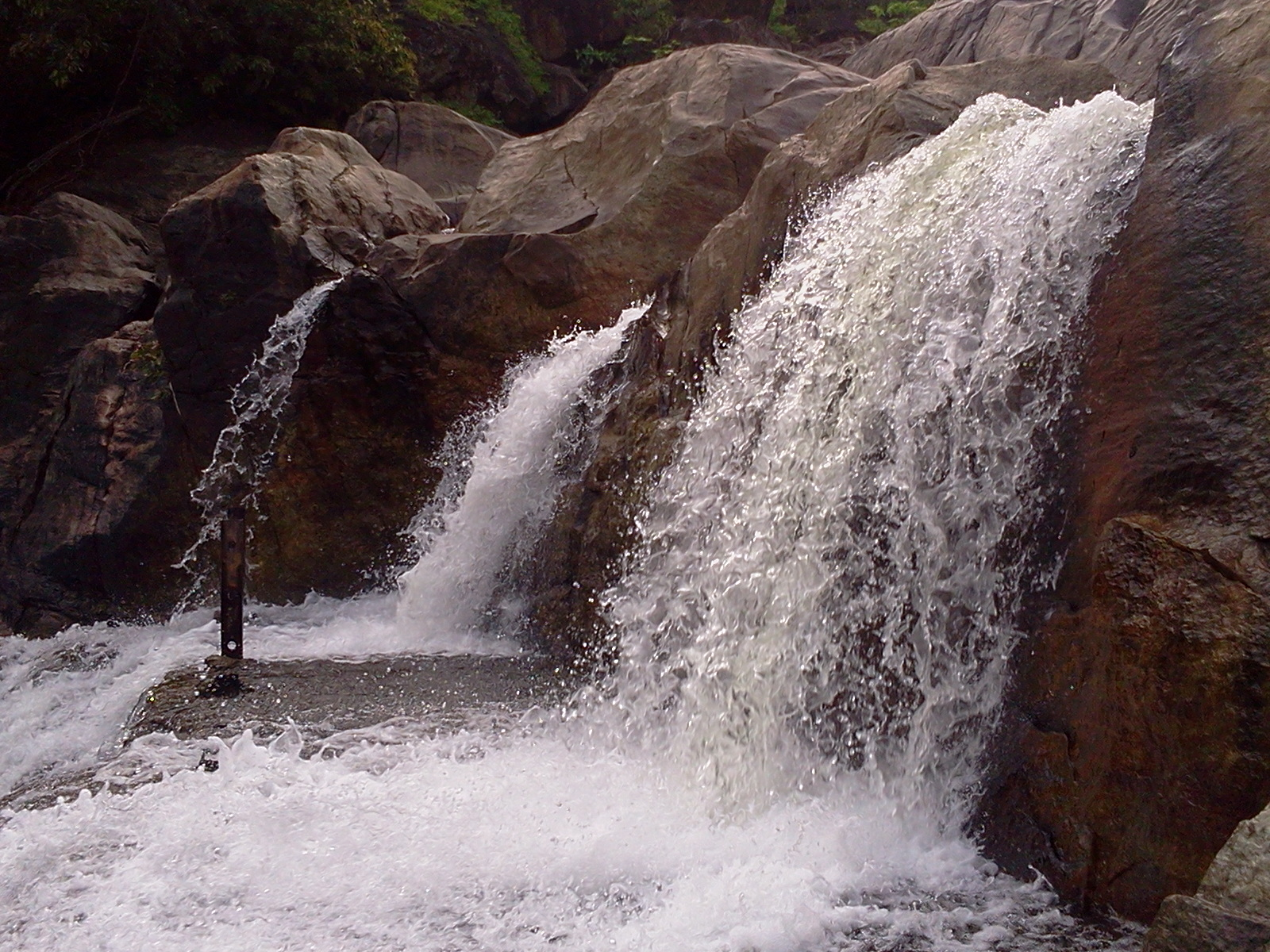
Manimuthar Falls

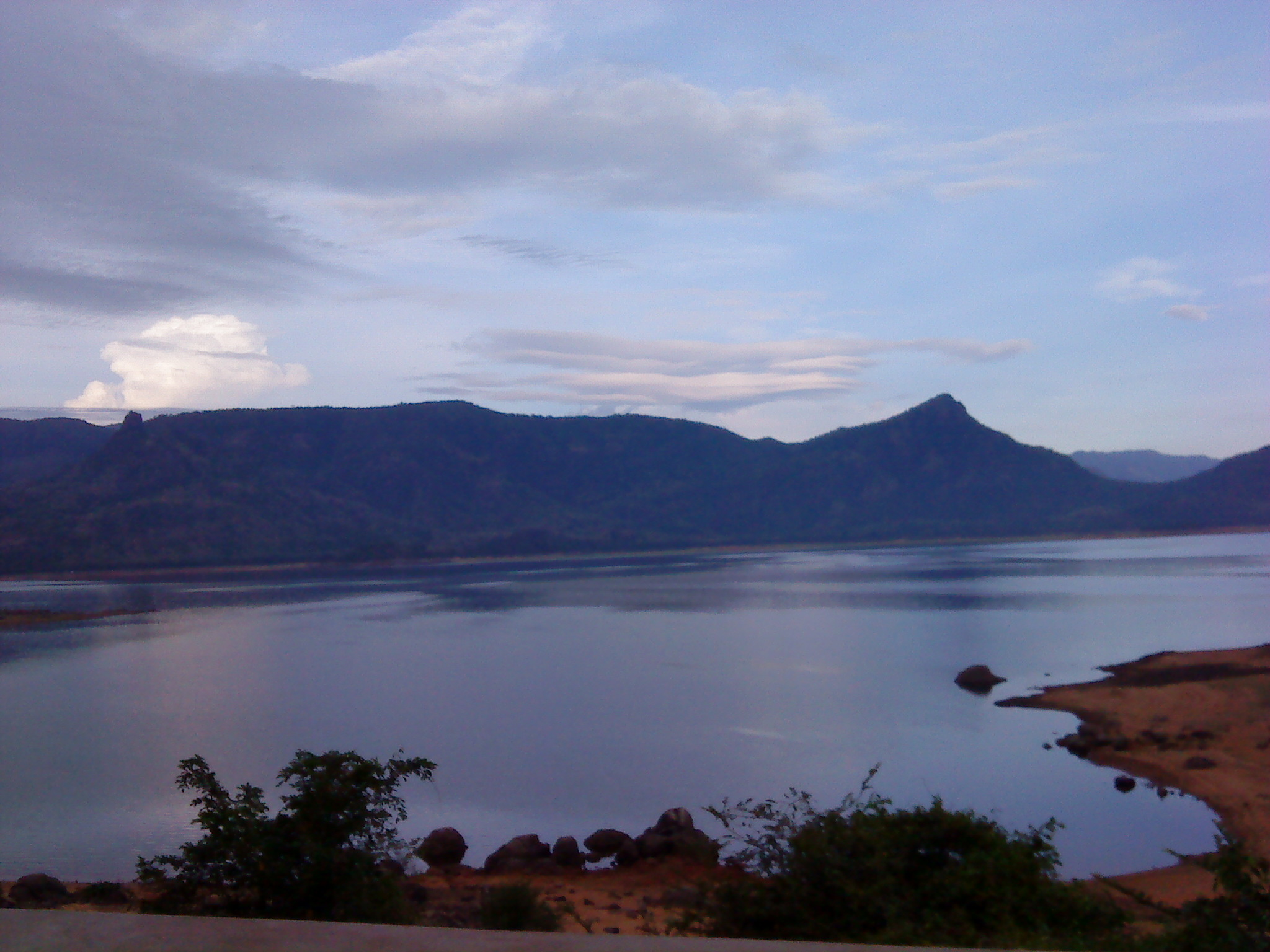
Manimuthar Dam in Tirunelveli District

Located between elevations ranging from 1,000 to 1,500 metres (3,300 to 4,900 ft), the Manjolai area is set deep within the Western Ghats within the Kalakad Mundanthurai Tiger Reserve in the Tirunelveli District. Located on top of the Manimuthar Dam and the Manimuthar Water Falls, the Manjolai area comprises tea plantations, small settlements around the tea plantations, Upper Kodaiyar Dam and a windy viewpoint called Kuthiravetti.

The tea plantations and the whole of Manjolai Estates are tea operated by The Bombay Burmah Trading Corporation Ltd on forest lands leased by Raja of Singampatti Samasthanam. There are three Tea Estates within the Manjolai area – Manjolai Estate, Manimutharu Estate and Oothu Estate. The Estates are located on elevations ranging between 700 and 1,280 metres (2,300 and 4,200 ft).

The estates, road and settlements in the Manjolai area are managed by The Bombay Burmah Trading Corporation Ltd. Only the workers of Bombay Burmah Trading Corporation Ltd and employees of TNEB can enter the zone without any permission. Tourists must get prior permission from Amabasamudram Range Office (KMTR) before entering into the forest range. Only four wheelers are allowed. A special tourist vehicle is also arranged by KMTR to visit the tea plantations. Prior intimation and fees must be paid in order to enter into the forest zone.
