= Appankoil =

- village
- Country: India
- State: Tamil Nadu

Languages
  - Official: Tamil
- Time zone: UTC+5:30 (IST)

Appankoil is a small hamlet on the northern side of the river Tamirabarani, after Tentirupperai in Tamil Nadu, India. Karimaharaja had ruled the place.
