= Suthamalli, Tirunelveli =

Sutthamalli
- village
- Country: India
- State: Tamil Nadu
- District: Tirunelveli

Languages
  - Official: Tamil English
- Time zone: UTC+5:30 (IST)
- Postal code: 627604
- Vehicle registration: TN 72
- Coastline: 0 kilometres (0 mi)
- Sex ratio: ♂/♀

Sutthamalli is a village in the Maanoor Revenue Block of Tirunelveli district, Tamil Nadu, India. It is located on the bank of Thamirabarani River. It is located near by Tirunelveli Municipal Corporation.

It is situated on State highway 41A ( Tirunveli - Pottalpudur), The nearby Railway station is Pettai Railway station. The nearby college is M.D.T Hindu college.
