= Pachaiyar River =

River in Tamil Nadu, India

Coordinates: 8.66656°N 77.667332°E

The Pachaiyar River originates on the eastern slopes of the Western Ghats approximately 1,000 metres (3,300 ft) above sea level in the state of Tamil Nadu in southern India. It then converges with the Tambaraparani River. Nine anicuts have been built across it before it loses its identity in the Tamiraparani.The river Pachaiyar has three tributaries which are Kavayan Odai, Anaikidangu Odai and Uppan Odai. These tributaries join the river Pachaiyar in the villages Arasppattu, Vadagarai and Padmaneri respectively.

The total length of the river from its origin to its merger with the Tamiraparani is about 32 kilometres (20 mi).
