= Thamirabarani River =

River in Tamil Nadu, India

Thamirabarani Tamraparni, Porunai
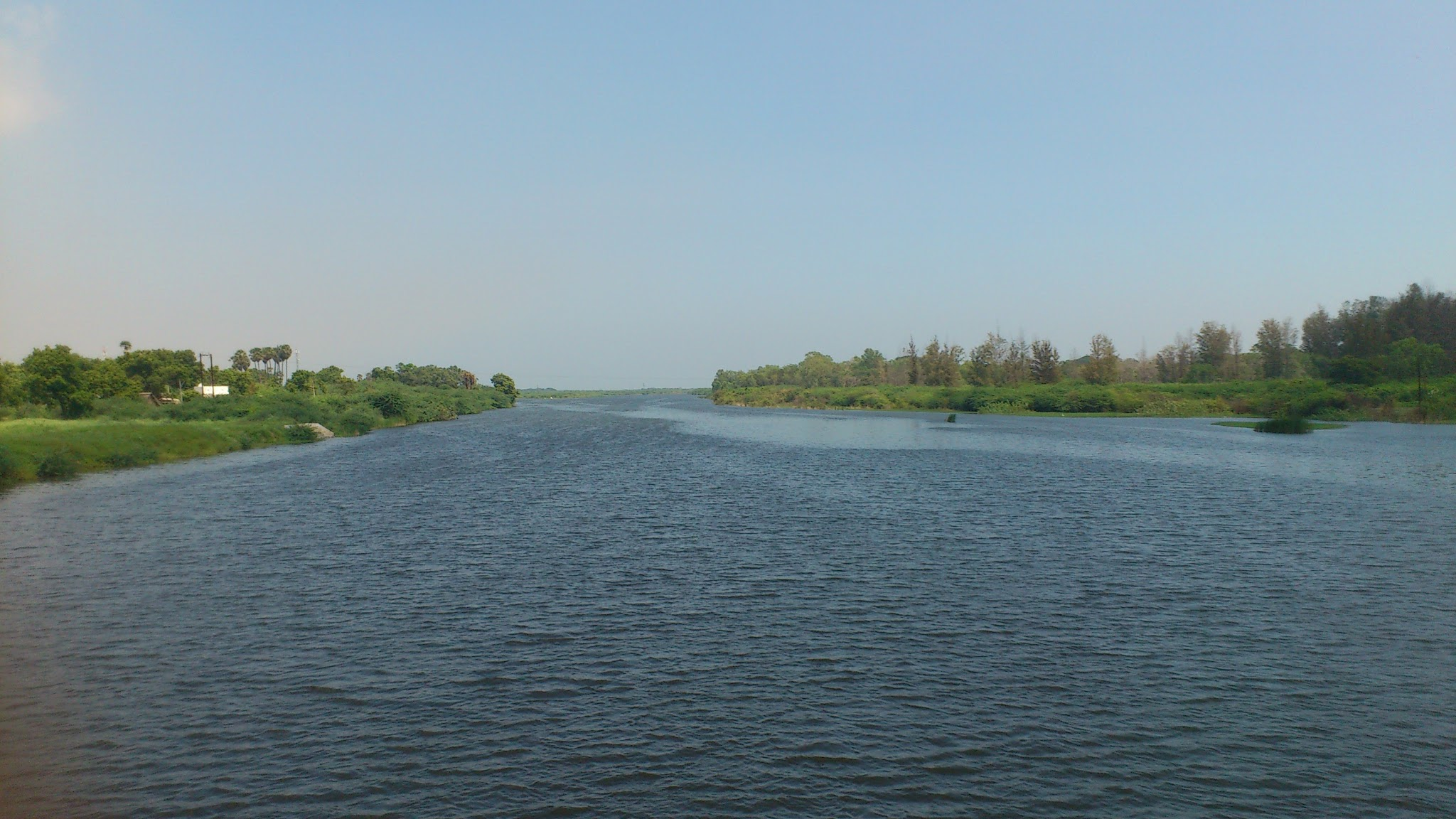
- River Thamirabarani from Authoor Bridge in Thoothukudi district

Location
- Country: India
- State: Tamil Nadu
- District: Tirunelveli, Thoothukudi
- Cities: Tirunelveli

Physical characteristics
- Source: Pothigai hills
  - coordinates: 8.601962°N 77.264131°E
- Mouth
  - location: Gulf of Mannar
  - coordinates: 8.641316°N 78.127298°E
- Length: 128 km (80 mi)
- Discharge
  - location: Srivaikundam
  - average: 32 m^{3}/s (1,100 cu ft/s)

Basin features
- Tributaries
  - left: Karaiyar, Servalar, Gadananathi, Chittar River
  - right: Manimutharu, Pachaiyar

The Thamirabarani or Tamraparni or Porunai is a perennial river that originates from the Agastyarkoodam peak of Pothigai hills of the Western Ghats, above Papanasam in the Ambasamudram taluk. It flows through Tirunelveli and Thoothukudi districts of the Tamil Nadu state of southern India into the Gulf of Mannar. It was called the Tamraparni River in the pre-classical period, a name it lent to the island of Sri Lanka. The old Tamil name of the river is Porunai. From the source to sea, the river is about 128 kilometres (80 mi) long and is the only perennial river in Tamil Nadu. This river flows towards north direction initially. However, it changes to east direction later.

== Etymology ==
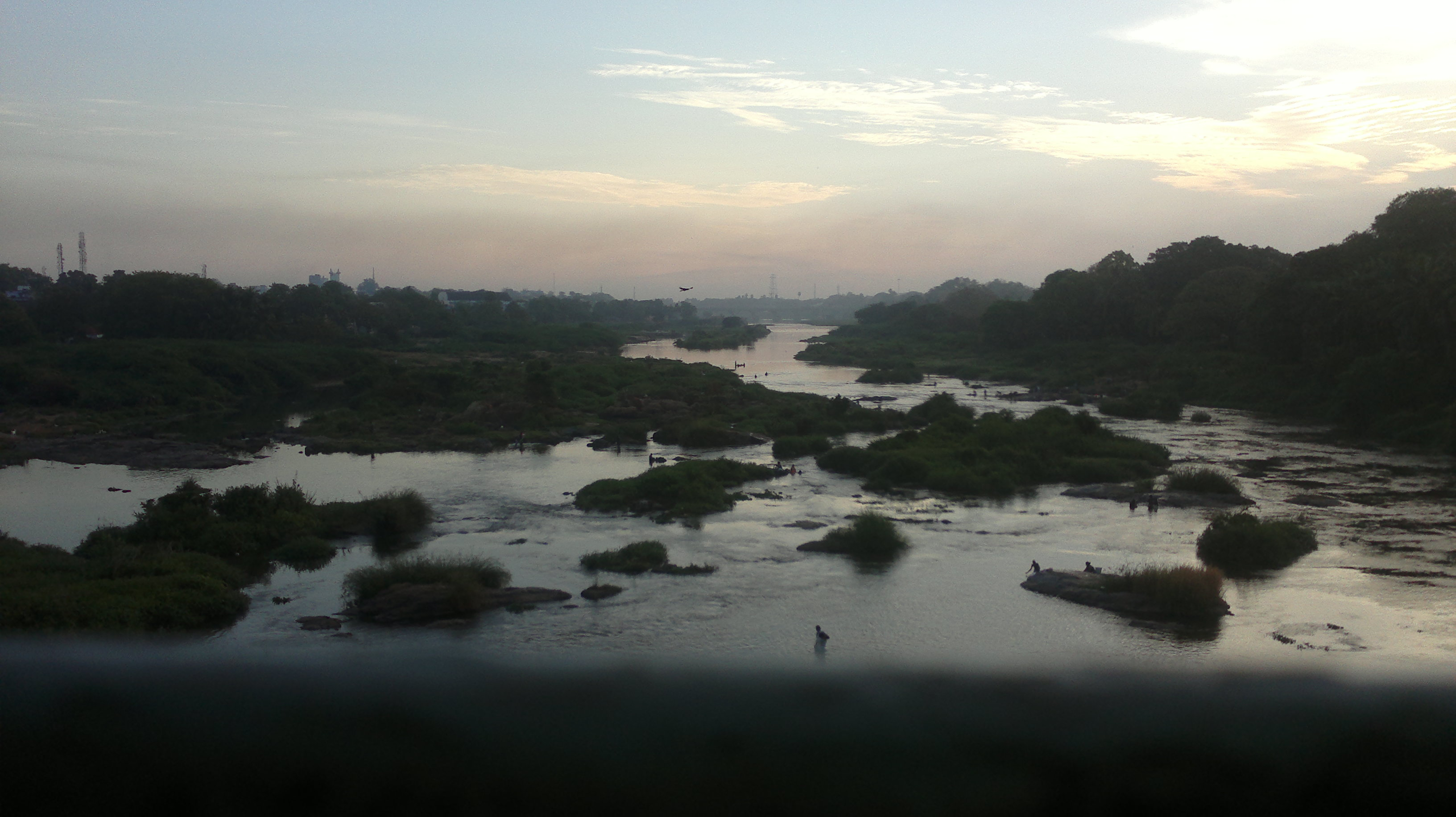
Thamirabarani river

From the Tamilakam era, the area of the Tamraparni river, in Tirunelveli, Tamil Nadu, has had changes in its name, from the original Tan Porunai river to Tamira Porunai, from Tamraparni to Tambraparni and now called "Thamirabarani River". A meaning for the term following its derivation became "copper-colored leaf", from the words Thamiram (copper/red) in Tamil/Sanskrit and parani meaning leaf/tree, translating to "river of red leaves". According to the Tamraparni Mahatmyam, an ancient account of the river from its rise to its mouth, a string of red lotus flowers from sage Agastya at Pothigai hills transformed itself into a damsel at the sight of Lord Siva, forming the river and giving it its divine name. Other name derivations include the Pali term "Tambapanni", "Tamradvipa" of Sanskrit speakers and "Taprobana" of ancient Greek cartographers.

Robert Knox reported from his 20 years of captivity on the island in the hills that "Tombrane is a name of the Sri Lankan Tamil people for God in Tamil, which they often repeated as they lifted up their hands and faces towards Heaven".

== History ==
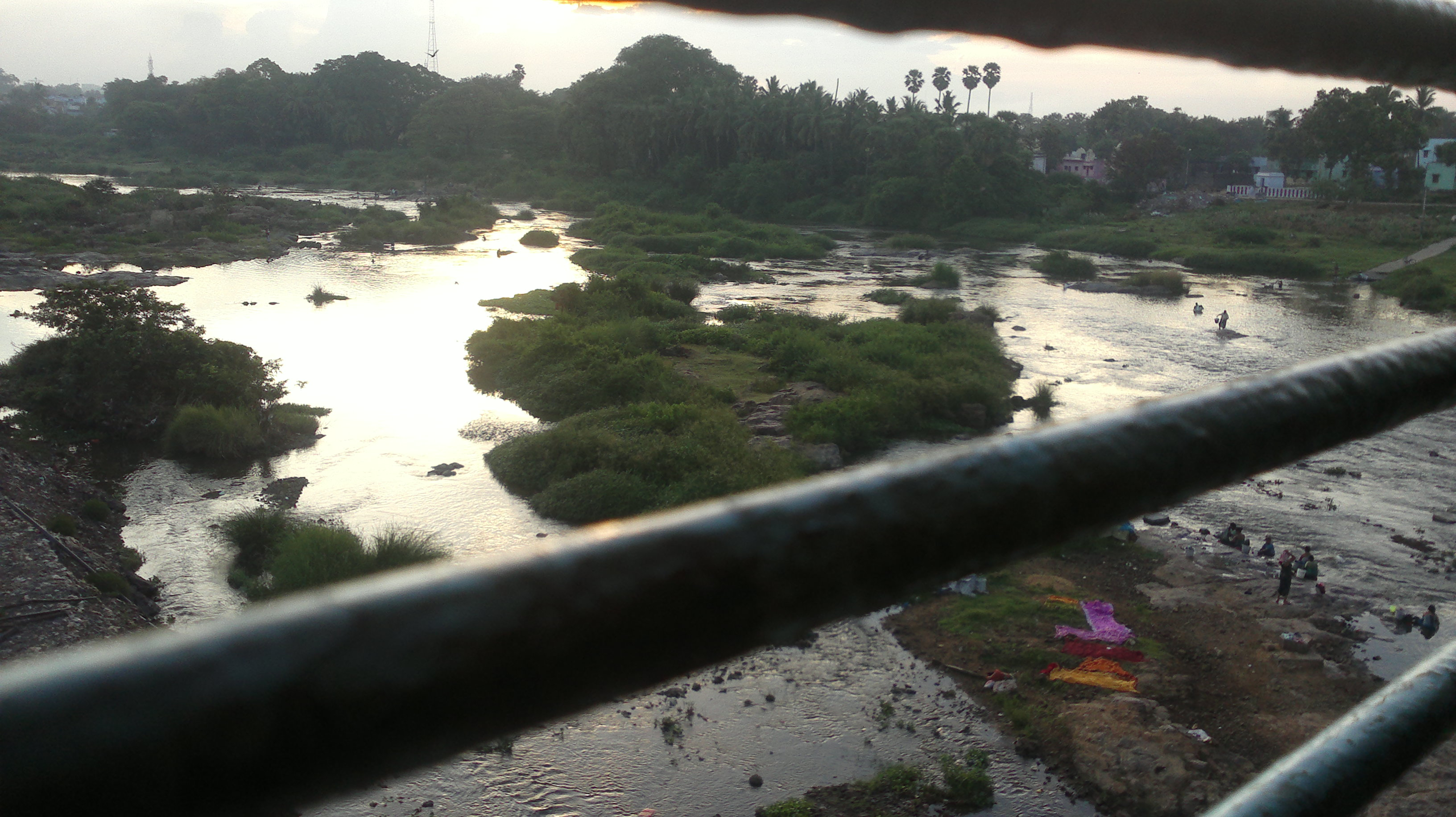
Thamirabarani river in dawn

Its many name derivations of Tan Porunai include Tampraparani, Tamirabarni, Tamiravaruni. Tan Porunai nathi finds mention by classical Tamil poets in ancient Sangam Tamil literature Purananuru. Recognised as a holy river in Sanskrit literature Puranas, Mahabharata and Ramayana, the river was famed in the Early Pandyan Kingdom for its pearl and conch fisheries and trade. The movement of people, including the faithful, trade merchants and toddy tapers from Tamraparni river to northwestern Sri Lanka led to the shared appellation of the name for the closely connected region. One important historical document on the river is the treatise Tamraparni Mahatmyam. It has many ancient temples along its banks. A hamlet known as Appankoil is located on the northern side of the river.

In the Mahābhārata (3:88) the river is mentioned as "Listen, O son of Kunti, I shall now describe Tamraparni. In that asylum the gods had undergone penances impelled by the desire of obtaining salvation".

A Miami-based Beta Analytic Testing Laboratory published a report in 2021 which claimed that the Tamirabharani civilization along the banks of the river dates back to 3,200 years.

== Hydrology ==
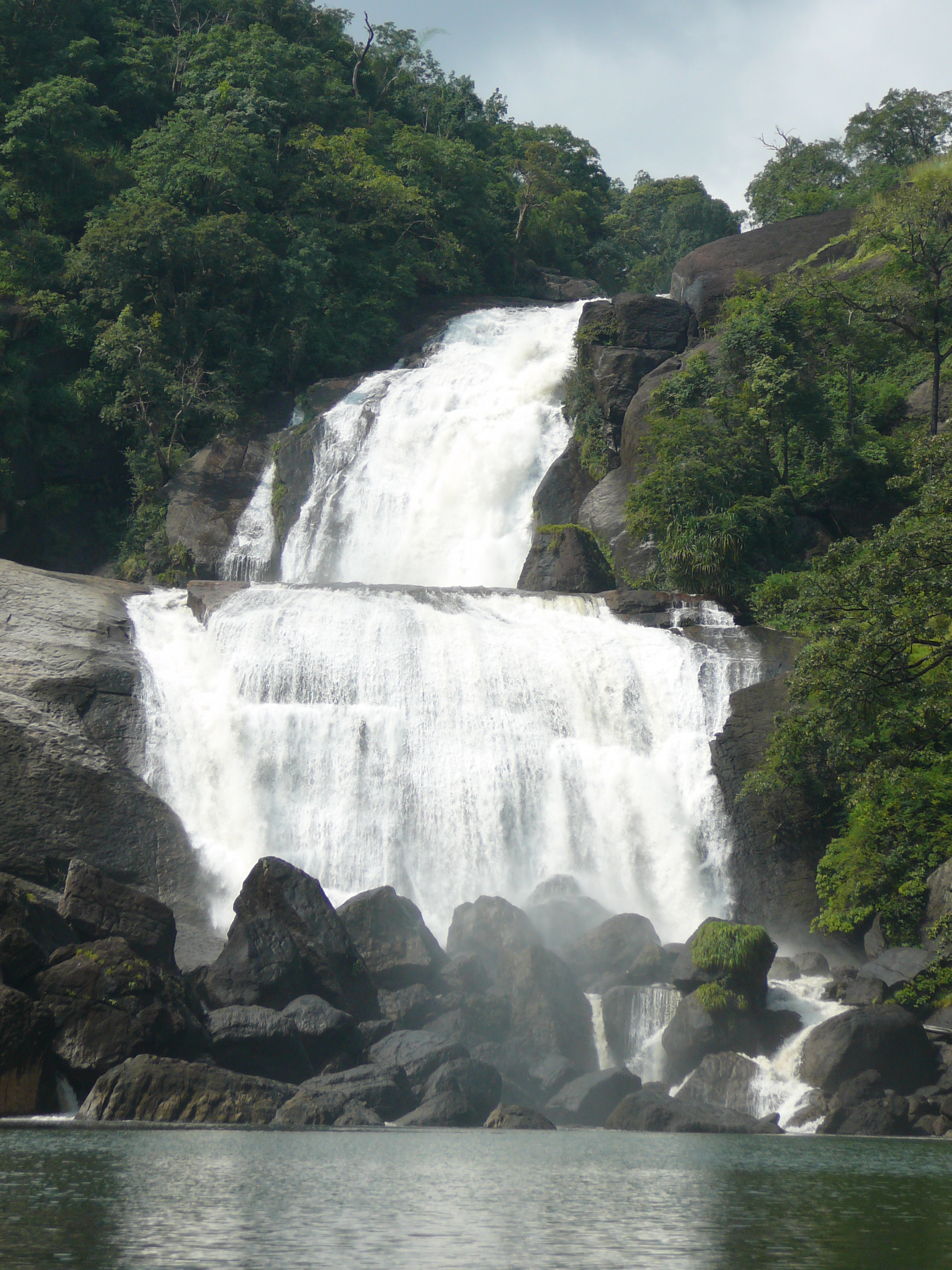
Paanatheertham waterfalls

=== Origin ===
The Thamirabarani River originates from the peak of the Pothigai hills on the eastern slopes of the Western Ghats at an elevation of 1,725 metres (5,659 ft) above sea-level. The river is joined by its headwater tributaries Peyar, Ullar, Pambar before it flows into the Karaiyar Dam reservoir, where it meets Karaiyar. The river forms the Paanatheertham waterfalls, 40 metres (130 ft) high, as it enters the Kariyar reservoir. Servalar joins the Thamirabarani before it enters into the Papanasam lower reservoir, which was built for the Papanasam Hydroelectric station. The river descends down the mountains near Papanasam, where it forms the Kalyanatheertham falls and Agasthiar falls.

=== Course and tributaries ===
The river flows on the plains eastwards from Papanasam. The first tributary to join Thamirabarani in the plains is the Manimuthar River, which originating from Manjolai hills and joins Thamirabarani near Aladiyoor village. The towns Ambasamudram and Kallidaikurichi are located respectively on the left and right banks of Thamiraparani, after which the river meets the tributary Gadananathi River at Tiruppudaimaruthur. Before the Gadananathi's entry into the Thamirabarani, the Gadananathi River is joined by the rivers Kallar, Karunaiyar and Veeranathi or Varahanathi which joins the river Gadananathi about 1.5 kilometres (0.9 mi) north-east of Kila Ambur.

The Gadananathi is fed by the Jambunathi and Ramanathi Rivers. The Pachaiyar River which originates from the Kalakkadu reserve forests at about 1,300 metres (4,300 ft) above sea level joins the Thamirabarani near Tharuvai village in Palayamkottai Taluk. The river bisects the twin cities Tirunelveli and Palayamkottai before meeting its major and affluent tributary Chithar (Chitranathi) which arises in the Kutralam hills and receives supply from the rivers Gundar, Hanumanathi and Karuppanathi(vairavangkulam kadayanallur) .The Chittar River runs almost parallel to Thamirabarani till it joins the main river near Sivalaperi. Thamirabarani passes through the taluks of Tirunelveli and Palayamkottai of Tirunelveli district and Srivaikundam and Tiruchendur taluks of Thoothukkudi district.

List of major tributaries

Tributaries	Length	Origin	Joins at	Length of course of Thamirabarani	Dams on the River
Koraiyar		Mundanthurai reserve forests	Karaiyar Dam	6 kilometres (4 mi)	Karaiyar Dam
Servalar River		Mundanthurai reserve forests	Papanasam Reservoir	22 kilometres (14 mi)	Servelar dam
Manimuthar River	9 kilometres (6 mi)	Manjolai hills	Aladiyoor	36 kilometres (22 mi)	Manimuthar Dam
Gadananathi River		Agasthyamala Biosphere Reserve	Tiruppudaimaruthur	43 kilometres (27 mi)	Gadananathi River Dam
Pachaiyar River	32 kilometres (20 mi)	Kalakkadu reserve forests	Tharuvai	61 kilometres (38 mi)	
Chittar River	80 kilometres (50 mi)	Kutralam Hills	Sivalaperi	73 kilometres (45 mi)	
Ramanathi River		Agasthyamala Biosphere Reserve	Kizha ambur	22 kilometres (14 mi)	Ramanathi River Dam

=== Drain ===
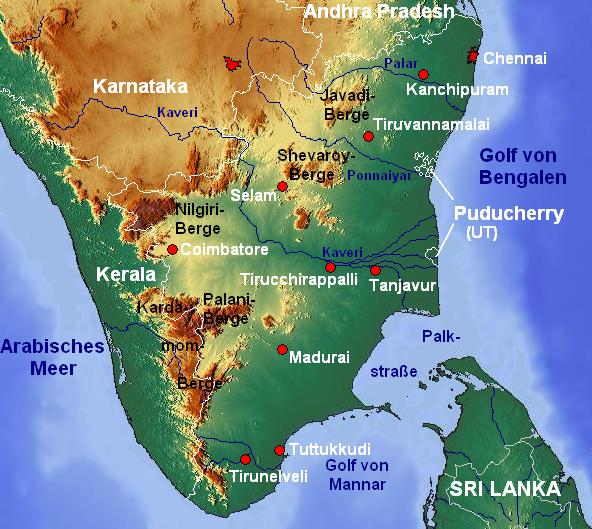
Map showing the river

The river drains into Gulf of Mannar near Punnaikayal in Tiruchendur taluk of Tuticorin district. The river drains with its tributaries an area of about 4,400 square kilometres (1,700 mi^{2}). As most of its extensive catchment areas lie in the Western Ghats, the river enjoys the full benefit of both the monsoons, which make the river perennial. Since all its tributaries are arising from the Western ghats, the river is prone to heavy floods especially during the northeast monsoon.

In 1992, there was an unexpected flood in Thamirabarani, which claimed hundreds of lives as the dam water was let out so massively and suddenly that the river and its channels could not bear the excess water inflow. It flooded again in 2015 with water entering the Kurukuthurai Murugan Temple, In December 18,19 2023 due to Massive rain fall in River Catchment area this river flooded again it discharged Maximum n 4.5 lakh Cubic feet water on Bay of Bengal . flood occurs the City of Tirunelveli, Palayamkottai in Tirunelveli district and Eral, Athur of Thoothukudi district Worsley affected during this Flood.

== Irrigation ==
The many anicuts, dams and reservoirs on the Thamirabarani river, along with those on the Manimuthar River, provide a large proportion of the water for irrigation and power generation for Tirunelveli district. It is fed by both the monsoons – the south west and the north-eastern and is seen in full spate twice a year if the monsoons do not fail. The Gadananathi River has 6 anicuts and a reservoir of 9,970,000 cubic metres (8,080 acre⋅ft), and irrigates 38.87 square kilometres (15.01 mi^{2}) of wetlands. The Ramanadhi has 7 anicuts, a reservoir of 4,300,000 cubic metres (3,500 acre⋅ft), and irrigates 20.23 square kilometres (7.81 mi^{2}) of wetlands. Pachaiyar River has 12 anicuts and irrigates 61.51 square kilometres (23.75 mi^{2}) of wet and dry lands.

The important irrigation channels branching off from both the banks of the river Thamirabarani are, South Kodaimelalagian channel, North Kodaimelalagian channel (Kodaimelalagian anicut), Nathiyunni channel (Nathiyunni anicut), Kannadian channel (Kannadian anicut), Kodagan channel (Ariyanayagipuram anicut), Palayam (Palavur anicut) channel, Tirunelveli channel (Suthamalli anicut), Marudur Melakkal, Marudur Keelakkal (Marudur anicut), South Main Channel and North Main Channel (Srivaikundam anicut). Of these the first seven anicuts were constructed during the period of ancient and medieval rulers and the last anicut namely the Srivaikundam anaicut was constructed and completed by the British in 1869.

List of dams across Thamirabarani river:

1. Kodaimelaalagain anicut, 1,281.67 hectares (3,167.1 acres)
2. Nathiyunni anicut, 1,049.37 hectares (2,593.0 acres)
3. Kannadian anicut, 2,266.69 hectares (5,601.1 acres)
4. Ariyanayagipuram anicut, 4,767.30 hectares (11,780.3 acres)
5. Palavur anicut, 3,557.26 hectares (8,790.2 acres)
6. Suthamalli anicut, 2,559.69 hectares (6,325.1 acres)
7. Marudur anicut, 7,175.64 hectares (17,731.4 acres)

List of channels:

1. South Kodaimelalagain channel
2. North Kodaimelalagain channel
3. Nathiyunni channel
4. Kannadian channel
5. Kodagan channel
6. Palayam channel
7. Tirunelveli channel
8. Marudur Melakkal

== Pollution and exploitation ==
- Mixing of sewage, paper mill and industrial effluents, dumping etc. into the river is a worrying aspect.
- Sand mining in this river was banned in 2010 but it still continues illegally.
- Illegal encroachments of its banks is also a growing concern.
- Pepsi and other Cola companies bottling facility plants were thought to be exploiting the river water, however a court ruling in April 2018 dismissed the allegations and allowed the companies to extract excess water as per the original agreements they have signed.
- Many industries have come in the banks of the river in and around Srivaikuntam that injudicially use the river water and discharge untreated sewer.
- Untreated sewer of towns like Ambasamudram, Tirunelveli, Papanasam etc. also reduce the water quality downstream.

== Fishes ==
Thamirabarani River is full of fishes and it is one of the perennial rivers in Tamil Nadu. Locals not involved in fishing resulting in the vast diversity of fishes in the river.

As water flows non-stop throughout the year, it is one of the most fish-rich river in the world where the river is dominated by more than 16 native Snakehead species. It is estimated that nearly 669 fish species found in the river.

=== Snakehead ===
Various types of snakehead fish species like Channa diplogramma, Channa bleheri, Channa striata, Channa maculata, Channa punctata, Channa harcourtbutleri, Channa asiatica, Channa marulius found throughout the river. Snakeheads are considered as top level predators in Thamirabarani River. Northern Snakehead also found in small numbers on the starting part of river where top level predators like other snakeheads are missing. Thamirabarani River is the largest reservoir of Snakehead in the world with 17 types of Snakeheads present in this river. Snakehead fishes are locally called as Viraal in Tamil and all the species are consumed as food around the regions of Thamirabarani when they enter paddy fields.

=== Catfish ===
Following Snakehead, Catfish are also abundant in the river. African Catfish are an invasive species first caught in 2009 in the Aruvankulam area of Tirunelveli district. The most common catfish species found are Blue Catfish, Channel Catfish, Flathead Catfish, Mystus guli Catfish, Pangas Catfish, P. hodgarti, Goonch catfish, Pseudolaguvia. 13 species of Catfish species found throughout this river.

=== Alligator Gar ===
Alligator Gar is not native to the river but caught sometimes. this was the result of releasing aquarium fish into the wild. on 2015, over 100 Juvenile alligator gar fishes caught and handed over to local authority. Because of the presence of huge number of native Snakehead fishes, the Alligator Gar invasion is not spreading and under control.

=== Eels ===
Eels found in this river mainly belongs to Anguillidae and Synbranchiformes family and most common one is Indian mottled eel (Anguilla b. bengalensis). 90 species of eel found in this river. the fish Macrognathus found in this river is mistakenly thought as eel because of its eel-like structure.

=== Carp ===
Carp fishes found in large numbers throughout the river. Three type of carp fishes are silver carp, grass carp, common carp. These three species of carp form 75% of carp fish population in Thamirabarani River.

=== Loaches ===
Large number of species of sucker fishes found throughout the river. the most common one is Acanthocobitis botia and Horseface loach.

Pangio loach, Schistura loach also common in this river and Schistura is mistakenly treated as snake or eel because of its snake-like appearance.

=== Others ===
Other fishes belong to genus Puntius, Devario, Etroplus, Mystus, Aplocheilus, Dawkinsia, Garra, Glossogobius, Macrognathus, Batasio, Barilius, Badidae, Clupisoma, Nemacheilus, Oreichthys, Oryzias, Osteobrama, Raiamas, Salmophasia, Tor (Masheer), Xenentodon, are commonly found in this river.
