= Agasthyamala Biosphere Reserve =

Indian Biosphere Reserve

The Agasthyamalai Biosphere Reserve is a biosphere reserve in India established in 2001, located in the southernmost end of the Western Ghats and includes 3,500.36 km^{2} (1,351.50 sq mi) of which 1828 km^{2} is in Kerala and 1672.36 km^{2} is in Tamil Nadu. It encompasses the following wildlife sanctuaries: Shendurney Wildlife Sanctuary, Peppara Wildlife Sanctuary, Neyyar Wildlife Sanctuary, and Kalakkad Mundanthurai Tiger Reserve.

In 2016, Agasthyamalai Biosphere Reserve became part of the UNESCO World Network of Biosphere Reserves.

== Location ==
ABR straddles the border of Pathanamthitta, Kollam and Thiruvananthapuram Districts in Kerala and Tirunelveli and Kanyakumari Districts in Tamil Nadu, South India at the southern end of the Western Ghats. The Biosphere lies Between 8° 8' to 9° 10' North Latitude and 76° 52' to 77° 34' East Longitude. Central location is 8°39′N 77°13′E.

It is composed of Neyyar, Peppara and Shendurney Wildlife Sanctuaries and their adjoining areas of Achencoil, Thenmala, Konni, Punalur, Thiruvananthapuram Divisions and Agasthyavanam Special Division in Kerala. Inclusion of adjoining areas of Kalakkad Mundanthurai Tiger Reserve in Tamil Nadu has been approved. The reserve now covers parts of Tirunelveli and Kanyakumari Districts in Tamil Nadu and Thiruvananthapuram, Kollam and Pathanamthitta Districts in Kerala.

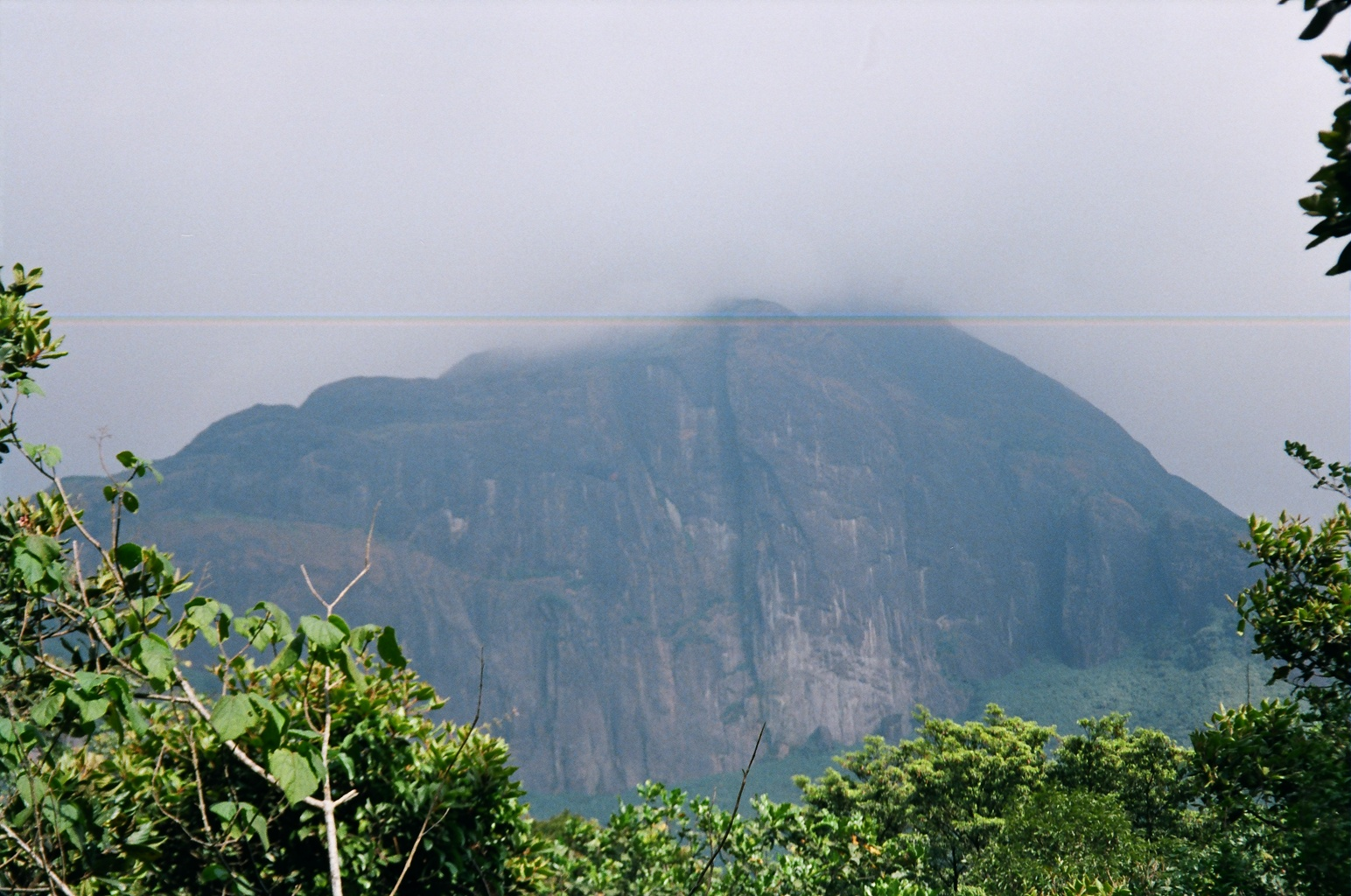
1868 m high Agastya Mala mountain

== Ecology ==
ABR includes the Indian Ecoregions of tropical wet evergreen forests, South Western Ghats moist deciduous forests, South Western Ghats montane rain forests and Shola. It is the habitat for 2,000 varieties of medicinal plants, of which at least 50 are rare and endangered species. Animals include the Bengal tiger, Asian elephant, and Nilgiri tahr. Agastyamalai is also home to the Kanikaran, one of the oldest surviving ancient tribes in the world. Ecotourism is popular in the area.

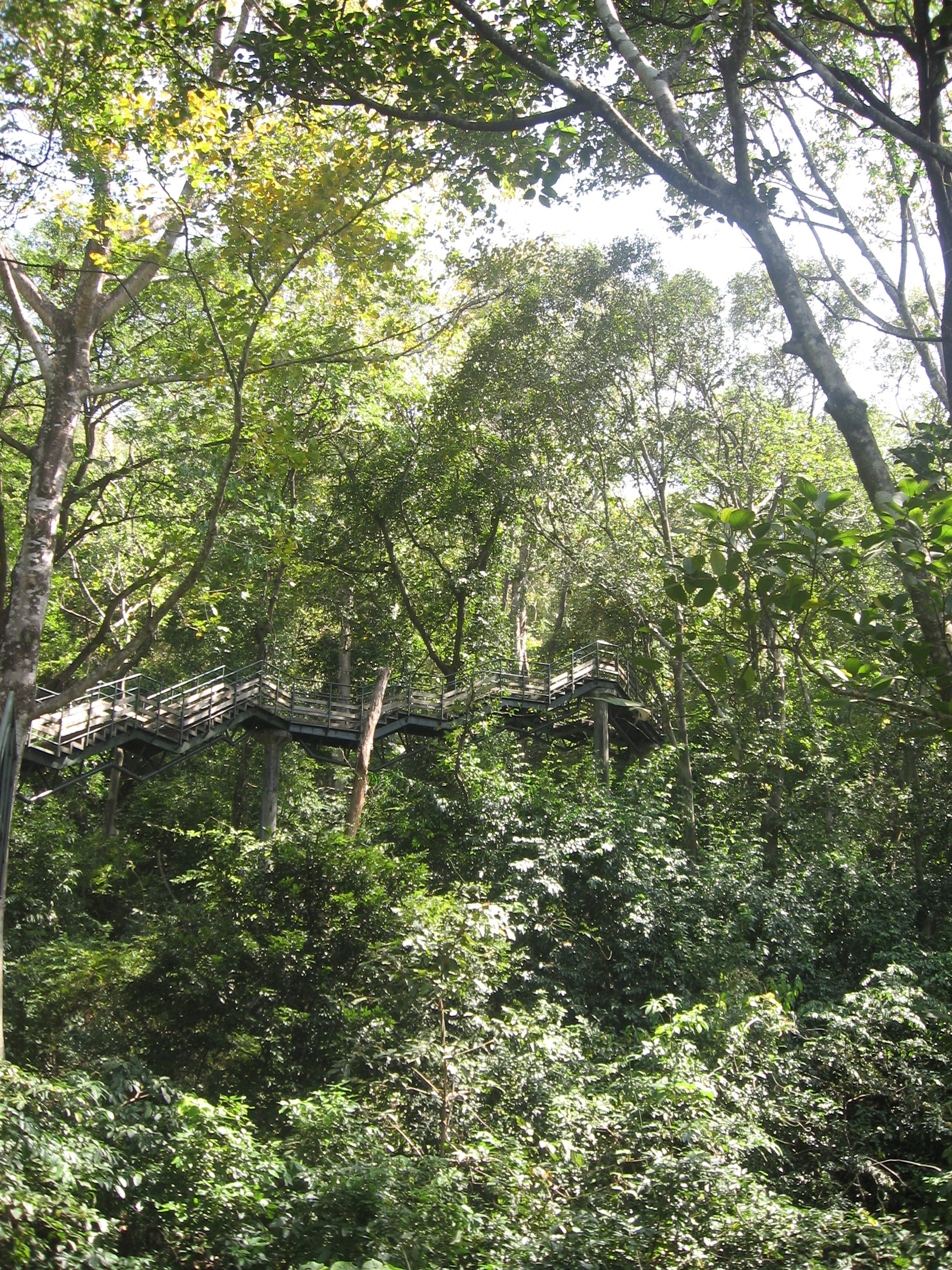
Thenmala Adventure Zone

Kanikkarans are the Original tribal Settlers in Agasthyamalai Biosphere Reserve.

== Management ==
A local committee and a state level Biosphere Management Committee co-ordinate the activities of various departments in the ABR area and ensure the scientific management of the ABR according to guidelines of the Indian Ministry of Environment and Forests.
