= Nambiyar River =

River in India

Coordinates: 8°14′N 77°48′E

The Nambiyar river runs across Nanguneri taluk in Tirunelveli district in Tamil Nadu state in India. It is a small river which runs for only 45 kilometres (28 mi). The river originates from near Thirukkurungudi village in the Western Ghats, about 1,500 metres (4,900 ft) above sea level, and ends at the Gulf of Mannar.

== Tributaries ==
The river has two tributaries called Parattaiyar and Thamaraiyar. Parattaiyar is a small stream originating from Mahendragiri Hills. Thamaraiyar is a combination of two small streams also originating in the same hills named Mombaiyar and Kodumudiyar. Both the tributaries join Nambiyar at the foothills of Mahendragiri Hills.

== Anaicuts ==
The river has a total number of nine anaicuts.
