= Anicut =

Type of dam

An anicut (Tamil: அணைக்கட்டு - Aṇaikaṭṭu; Kannada: ಆಣೆಕಟ್ಟು - Āṇekaṭṭu; Telugu: ఆనకట్ట - ÃnaKaṭṭa) is a masonry check dam that is constructed across a stream to impound water for maintaining and regulating irrigation. The water stored behind an anicut can be used for irrigation of crops or drinking water for humans and livestock. They also are used to increase the residence of water to recharge groundwater, especially wells located downstream. Anicuts are also used in wildlife sanctuaries to provide sufficient water hole for will animals or to provide habitats for aquatic flora and fauna.

== Construction ==
The selection of an appropriate site for construction is very important as to minimize cost and maximize efficacy. The site should be where maximum storage of water is possible with minimum dam length, such as a deep, narrow section of a valley with steep slopes. Anicuts require a stream gradient of more than 1:100. Commonly built out of stone, Anicuts can last several centuries without failing, and even longer with semi-regular maintenance or improvements over time. A well built example is the Kallanai Dam, an over 1850 year old anicut dam constructed during the Chola Dynasty in the South Indian state of Tamil Nadu. The anicut serves the local farmers as a way to irrigate their crops

== Location ==
Most anicuts are found in Southeast Asia, with the vast majority of them located in either India or Sri Lanka.
