= Manoor =

Manoor may refer to places in India:

- Manoor, Medak, a village and mandal in Medak district in Telangana
- Manoor, Udupi, a village in Udupi district, Karnataka
- Manur (Tirunelveli), a village in Tirunelveli district, Tamil Nadu, India
  - Manoor block
  - Manur taluk (Tirunelveli)
- Tirumanur, a village in Tamil Nadu, India
