= Kurugapuram =

Village in Tamil Nadu, India

Kurugapuram Marichikatti
- Country: India
- State: Tamil Nadu
- District: Tirunelveli

Kurugapuram is a small village near Thisayanvilai panchayat town in the Indian state of Tamil Nadu.

== Introduction ==
Kurugapuram is a small village near Thisayanvilai.

== Pincode ==
Pincode of Kurugapuram 627 657 under Radhapuram Taluk. The same pincode also used for other villages including Mannarpuram, Kalikumarapuram, Kumarapuram, Mahadevankulam, Muthukrishnapuram, Navaladi, Samaria and Thisayanvilai.
