= Mela Ilandaikulam =

- Village
- Location in Tamil Nadu, India Mela Ilandaikulam (India)
- Coordinates: 8.9428°N 77.6858°E
- Country: India
- State: Tamil Nadu
- District: Tirunelveli
- Talukas: Manur

Area
  - Total: 4 km^{2} (1.5 sq mi)

Population (2017)
  - Total: 3,824
  - Density: 960/km^{2} (2,500/sq mi)

Languages
  - Official: Tamil
- Time zone: UTC+5:30 (IST)
- PIN: 627951
- Telephone code: 04636292xxx
- Vehicle registration: TN72, TN76, TN79
- Largest city: Tirunelveli
- Nearest city: Sankarankovil; Kayatharu
- Literacy: 67%
- Lok Sabha constituency: Tenkasi

Mela Ilandaikulam a village in Manur taluk, Tirunelveli district, Tamil Nadu state, India. It is situated west of National Highway 7 between Kayathar and Devarkulam, 6 km from Devarkulam and 09 km from Kayathar. There is 1 higher secondary school, 1 middle school and 1 primary school.

== Economy ==
The primary business of Mela Ilandaikulam is agriculture. The primary crops produced by the village include: rice, cotton, onions, tomatoes, green chili peppers and peanuts.

== Demographics ==
The 2011 census registered a village population of 3,824, with 1,897 males and 1,927 females. The literacy rate is 67%. 56% of the population are classified as workers, with the non-workers including housewives, children, and students. 10% of the population was under six years of age.

== Infrastructure ==
Mela Ilandaikulam has over five hundred Suzlon Energy windmills, each generating about 600 kW to 2100 kW of electricity.

== Education ==
- R.C. Primary School (Grades 1-5)
- TDTA Middle School (Grades 1-8)
- Thiru Iruthaya Higher Secondary School (Grades 6-12)

== Culture ==
Mela Illandaikulam has Temples, Mosques, and Churches.

- The Hindu Temples include
  - Sillai Kari Endra Ariyanachi Amman
    (Maravar street temple)
  - Ulagamman temple
    (Yadavar street temple)
  - Annamalai swamy Temple
  - Sri Mariamman Temple
  - vadakuvaselvi amman
  - Sakthi vinayagar Temple
  - Sudalai Madan Temple
  - Isakki Amman Temple
  - Sri Ganesha Temple
  - Sri meensudalai madasamy
  - Aiyanar Temple
  - Karuppa Sami Temple
  - sriman narayanasamy Temple
- The Islamic mosques include
  - Pallivaasal Mosque
- The churches include
  - St. Paul Church of the Church of South India (CSI). They celebrate Christmas, and also have a seven-day festival every 20 May
  - Church of the Sacred Heart of Jesus (St. Annai Velankanni Matha Church). They are part of the Roman Catholic Church They hold annual festivals in the second week of May, and also the Thiru Iruthaya Andavar festival, which starts on 20 May, and which lasts for three days.

== Image gallery ==
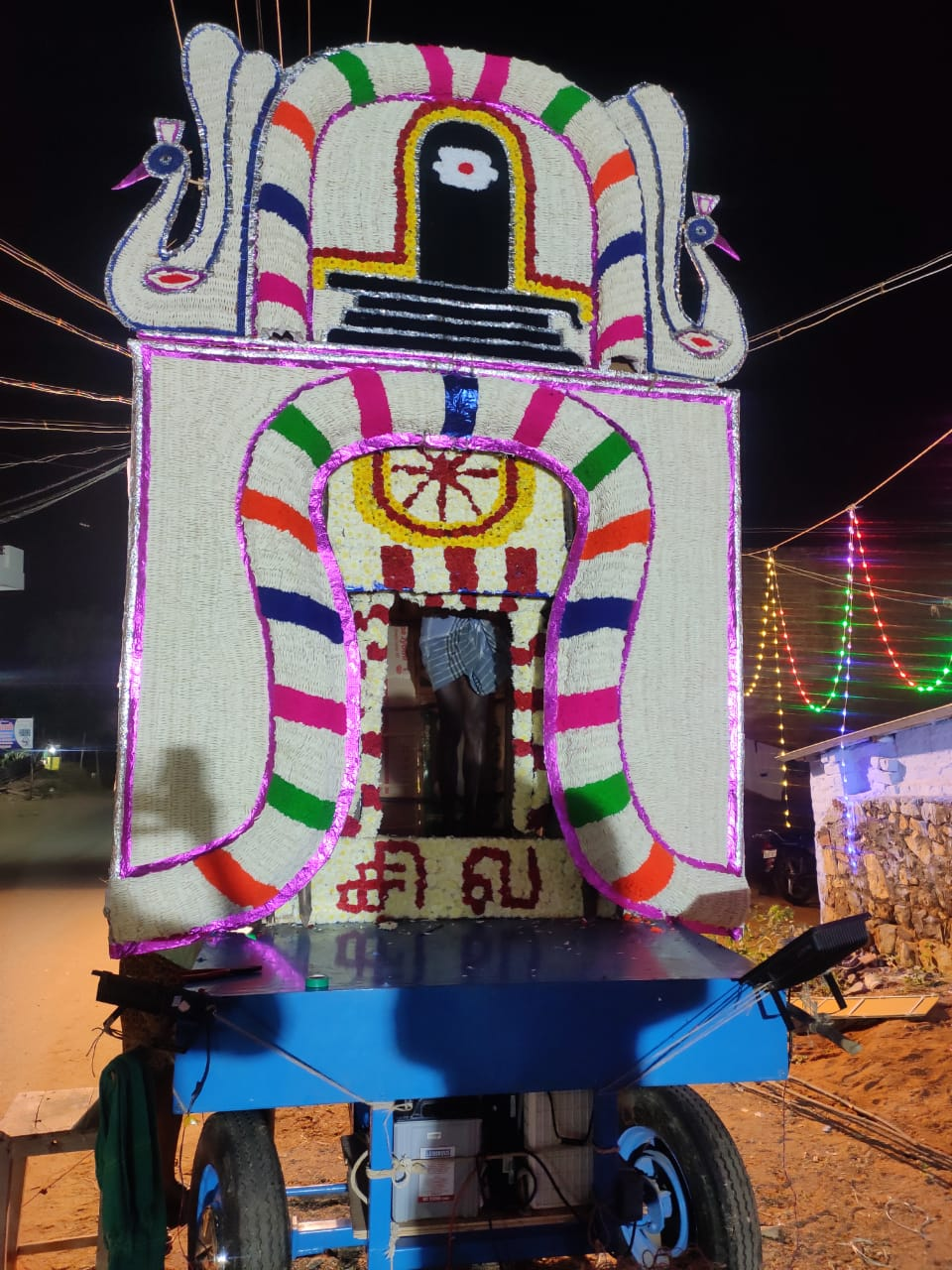
Annamalai swami Temple Veedhi ula

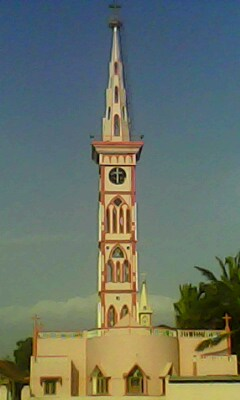
St. Paul Church (CSI Groups) in Mela Ilandaikulam.

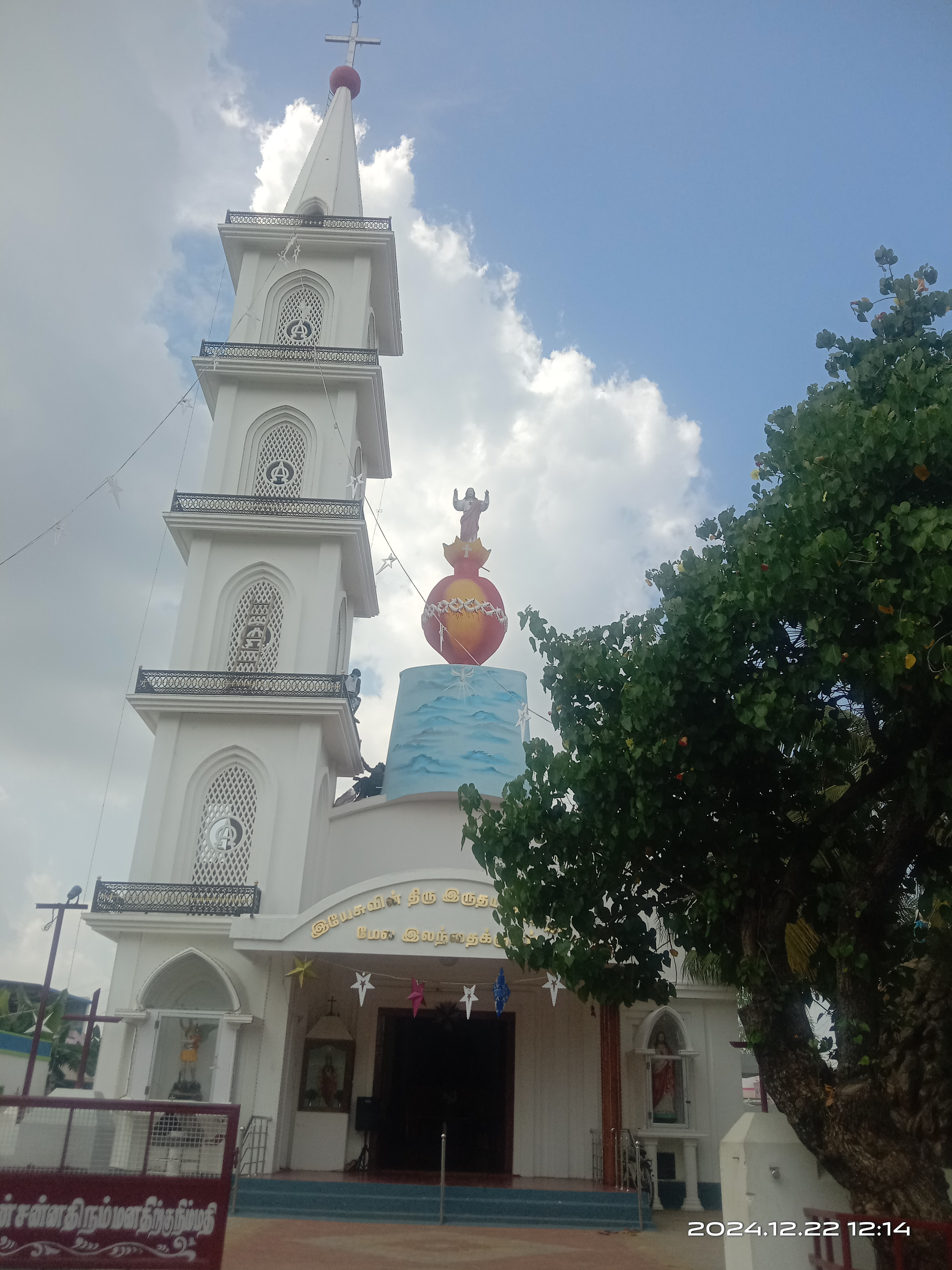
Church of Sacred Heart of Jesus, RC Church in Mela Ilandaikulam.

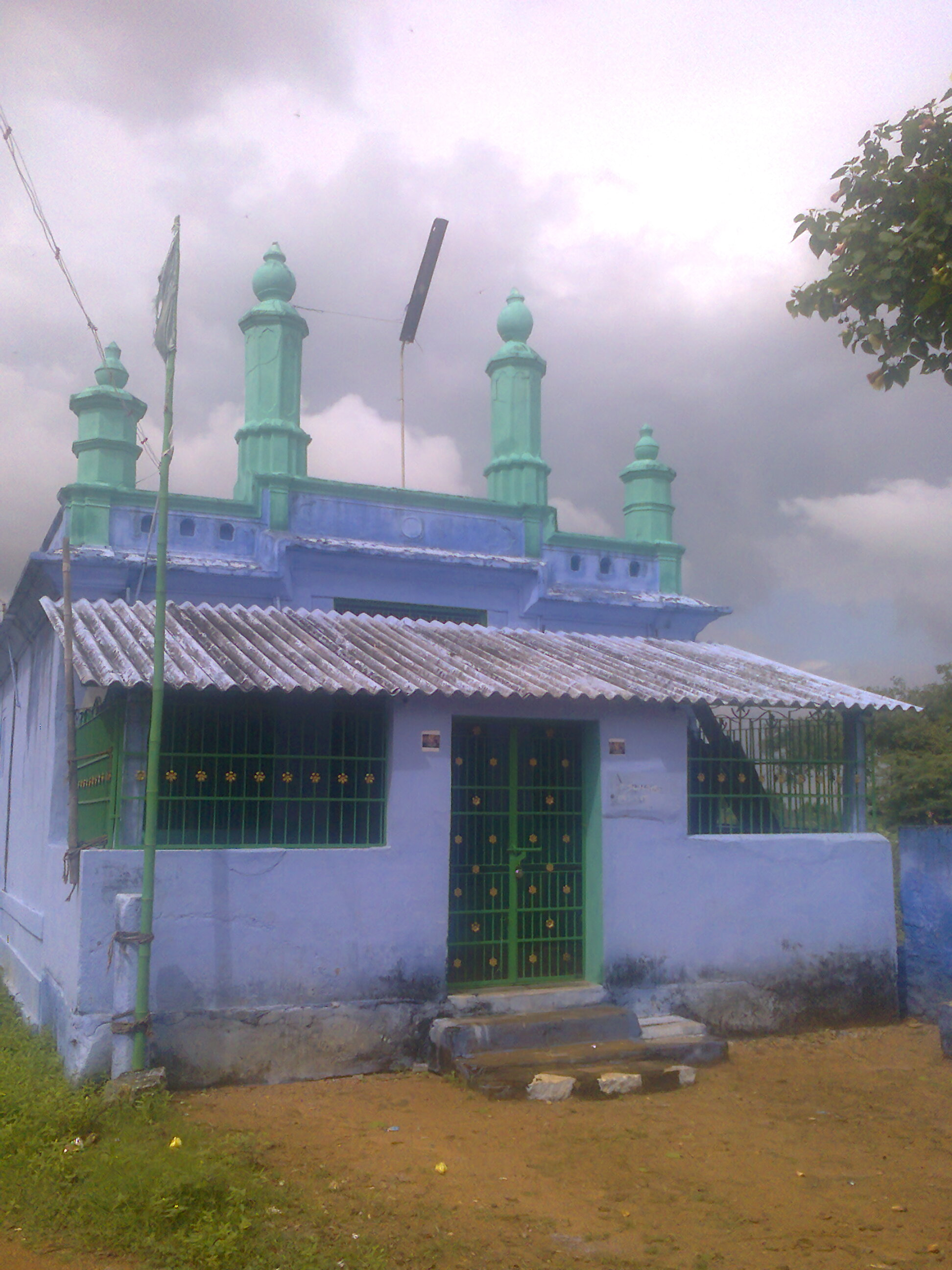
Mosque in Mela Ilandaikulam

Veilatchi Amman Temple, a Hindu temple located in Mel Ilanthaikulam, Tirunelveli district, Tamil Nadu, India

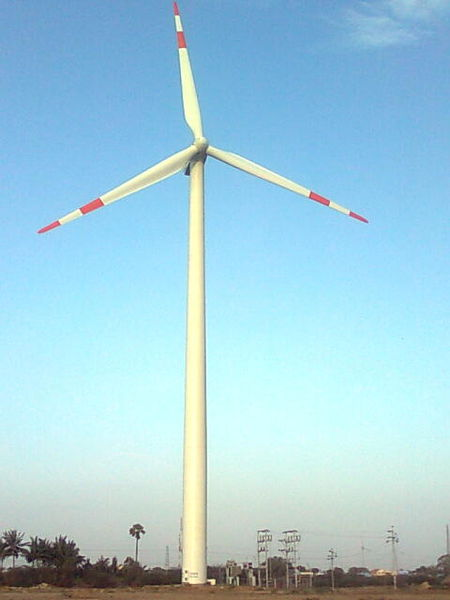
Windmill in Mela Ilandaikulan.
