= Manur (Tirunelveli) =

- Village
- Nickname: Maanoor
- Location in Tamil Nadu, India Manur (India)
- Coordinates: 8.854643°N 77.652536°E
- Country: India
- State: Tamil Nadu
- District: Tirunelveli
- Talukas: Manur

Area
  - Total: 1,336.05 km^{2} (515.85 sq mi)
- Elevation: 49 m (161 ft)

Population (2011)
  - Total: 4,348
  - Density: 3.254/km^{2} (8.429/sq mi)

Languages
  - Official: Tamil
- Time zone: UTC+5:30 (IST)
- PIN: 627951
- Telephone code: 0462xxx
- Vehicle registration: TN72, TN76, TN79
- Largest city: Tirunelveli
- Nearest city: Sankarankovil; Mela Ilandaikulam Village
- Literacy: 71.7%
- Lok Sabha constituency: Tirunelveli

Manur or Manoor is a Village in Manur taluk, Tirunelveli district, Tamil Nadu State, India. It is situated along State highway 41 (SH-41) between Tirunelveli and Sankarankovil on the Road. This Village is located 26 Kilometre North Side of Tirunelveli.

== Demographics ==
According to the 2011 census, the village of manur had a population of 4348 with 2161 males and 2187 females. The village had a literacy rate of 71.7%. Child population in the age group below 6 was 239 Males and 210 Females.

== See also ==
- Manur taluk
- Manur block
