= Devarkulam =

Devarkulam Thevarkulam
- Village
- Location in Tamil Nadu, India Devarkulam (India)
- Coordinates: 8.965216°N 77.635624°E
- Country: India
- State: Tamil Nadu
- District: Tirunelveli
- Talukas: Manur

Area
  - Total: 106.87 km^{2} (41.26 sq mi)
- Elevation: 154 m (505 ft)

Population (2011)
  - Total: 9,450
  - Density: 88.4/km^{2} (229/sq mi)

Languages
  - Official: Tamil
- Time zone: UTC+5:30 (IST)
- PIN: 627951
- Telephone code: 04636xxx
- Vehicle registration: TN72, TN76
- Largest city: Tirunelveli
- Nearest city: Sankarankovil; Tirunelveli
- Literacy: 69.80%
- Lok Sabha constituency: Tirunelveli
- Vidhan Sabha constituency: Sankarankoil
- Parliament MP: Gnanathiraviam
- Assembly MLA: Nainar Nagendran

Devarkulam or Thevarkulam is a small town in Manur taluk, Tirunelveli district, Tamil Nadu State, India. It is situated along State highway 41 (SH-41) between Tirunelveli and Sankarankovil on the Road. This Village is located 27 Kilometre North Side of Tirunelveli, and 27 Kilometre South side of Sankarankovil.

== Demographics ==
According to the 2011 census, the village of Devarkulam had a Population of 4,940 with 2,412 males and 2,528 females. The village had a literacy rate of 69.80%. Child population in the age group below 6 was 239 Males and 237 Females.
