= Kizhavaneri =

Kizhavaneri Kilavaneri
- Village
- Location in Tamil Nadu, India
- Coordinates: 8.376944°N 77.641944°E
- Country: India
- State: Tamil Nadu
- District: Tirunelveli

Languages
  - Official: Tamil
- Time zone: UTC+5:30 (IST)
- PIN: 627117
- Telephone code: 914637
- Vehicle registration: TN 72 V
- Nearest city: Vallioor/Nagercoil
- Lok Sabha constituency: Tirunelveli
- Vidhan Sabha constituency: Radhapuram

Kizhavaneri is a small village located about 50 km away from Tirunelveli, south part of Tamil Nadu, India. It is an old village and the people living here are staying more than 500 years. The village is famous for St. Anne's Church which is located in the center of the village.

== Geography ==
Kizhavaneri is located 4 km East to Vadakkuvalliyur, and 1 km away from Thiruchendur Road

== Landmark ==
Saint Anne's Church, Kizhavaneri parish comes under Roman Catholic Diocese of Tuticorin.
