= Naranammalpuram =

Naranammalpuram thalaiyuthu
- town
- Location in Tamil Nadu, India
- Coordinates: 8°46′28″N 77°43′04″E
- Country: India
- State: Tamil Nadu
- District: Tirunelveli
- Taluka: Tirunelveli

Population (2011)
  - Total: 17,386

Languages
  - Official: Tamil
- Time zone: UTC+5:30 (IST)
- Postal code: 627357

Naranammalpuram is a panchayat town in Tirunelveli district in the Indian state of Tamil Nadu.

== Demographics ==
In the 2001 India census, Naranammalpuram had a population of 15,238. Males constituted 50% of the population and females 50%. Naranammalpuram had an average literacy rate of 74%, higher than the national average of 59.5%: male literacy was 79%, and female literacy was 68%. In 2001 in Naranammalpuram, 11% of the population was under 6 years of age.

In the 2011 census, Naranammalpuram had a population of 17,386.
