= Saint Paul Church, Mela Ilandaikulam =

Building in India

St. Paul Church
- தூய பவுல் தேவாலயம்
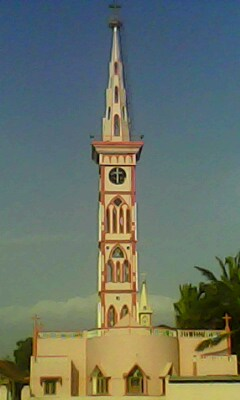
- St.Paul Church in Tamil Nadu, Mela Ilandaikulam (village)

Religion
- Affiliation: Church of South India
- Ecclesiastical or organisational status: Young Church
- Status: Active

Location
- Location: Mela Ilandaikulam, : Tirunelveli, Tamil Nadu, India
- Interactive map of St. Paul Church
- Coordinates: 8°56′35″N 77°41′7″E

Architecture
- Style: Gothic
- Completed: 28 December 1903

Specifications
- Length: 50.4 m (165 ft)
- Width: 10.3 m (34 ft)
- Width (nave): 10 metres (33 ft)
- Spire height: 50.4 metres (165 ft)

Saint Paul's Church Mela Ilandaikulam (Tamil: தூய பவுல் தேவாலயம்) in Tirunelveli District, Tamil Nadu, is located in Mela Ilandaikulam, India.

== History ==
St. Paul Church Mela Ilandaikulam Tirunelveli diocese (marai mavattam), launched on 28 December 1903. If the Christian people of this village after 2005 started work in the church tower. But church tower the opening ceremony of was observed on 20 May 2007. The churches of Manur and Erandum sollan function under the jurisdiction of this church.

== Festival and specialities ==
Every year on 20 May, a seven-day festival takes place. The first day is for prayer and worship. The second day a gospel meeting follows; school children's art shows play an important role. Festivities take place at night. Many people return to the village during the festival.

== Campanile ==
The height of the church tower is 50.4 metres (165 ft), its width is 10.3 metres (34 ft). Its interior is includes the giant campanile. The bell is sounded when a fire breaks out and for marriages and funeral.
