= Tenkasi Pandyas =

Rulers of the Pandya dynasty (1422–1618)

- 1422–1618
- A close depiction of Tenkasi Pandiya flag as per archaeological findings and historians illustration.

- Location of the present day Tenkasi (Capital of Tenkasi Pandyas) and Madurai (Pandya dynasty's traditional capital)
- Capital: Tenkasi
- Official languages: Tamil
- Religion: Hinduism (Official); Buddhism; Jainism
- Government: Monarchy
  - 1422–1463: Sadaavarman Parakrama
  - 1613–1618: Varagunarama
- Historical era: Early modern era
  - Established: 1422
  - Disestablished: 1618
Preceded by	Succeeded by
Medieval Pandyas; Delhi Sultanate	Madurai Nayak dynasty; Nayaks of Gingee
- Today part of: Tamil Nadu, India

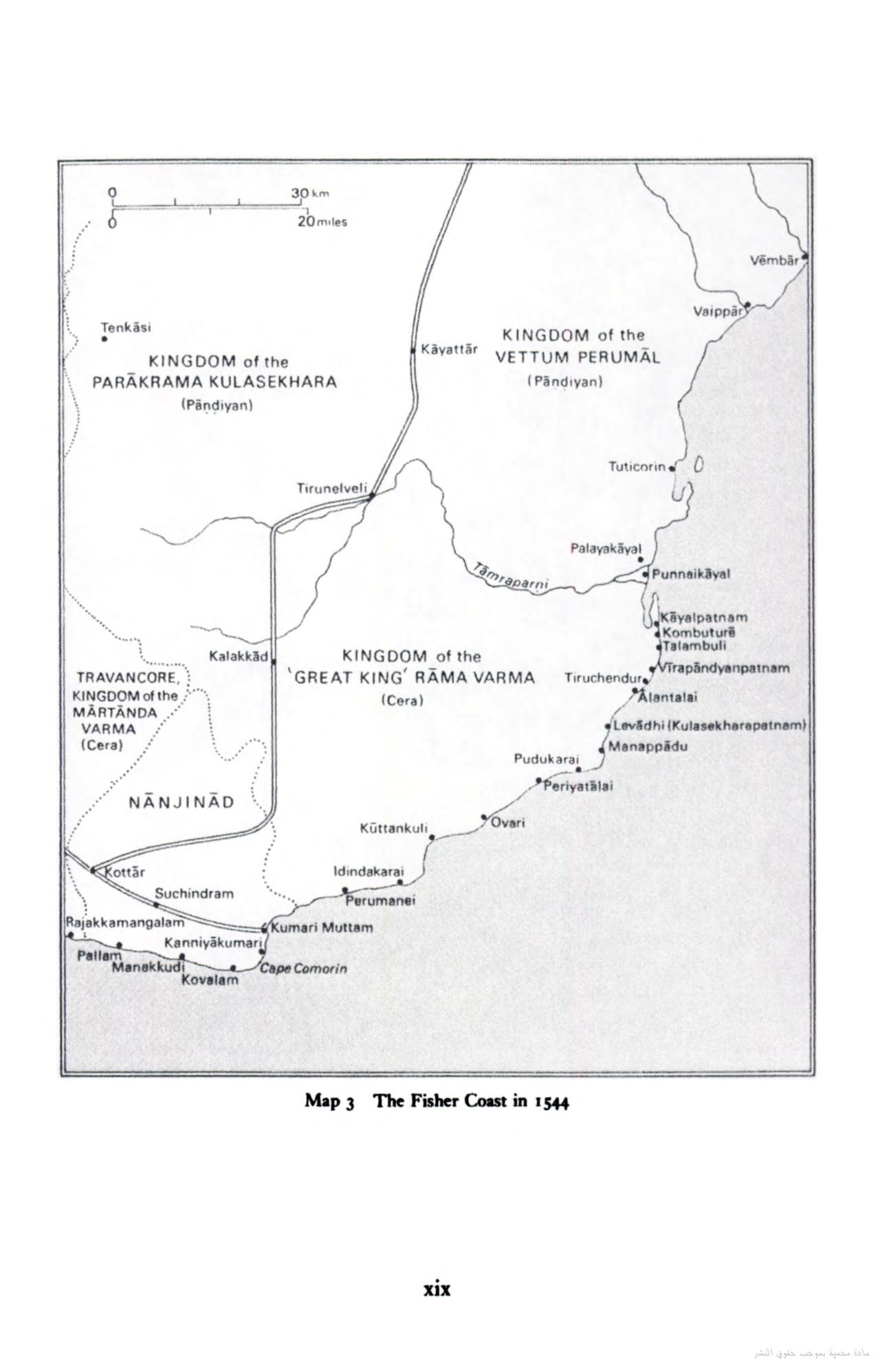
Map of Tenkasi and Tirunelveli pandiyas

Tenkasi Pandyas were the Pandya kings from Sadaavarman Parakrama Pandya to his successors who ruled with Tenkasi as their capital. With the invasion of the Sultanates, Vijayanagaras, and Nayakars from the fourteenth century onwards, the Pandyas lost their traditional capital of Madurai and shifted to cities like Tenkasi and Tirunelveli. Tenkasi was the last capital of the Pandyas. All the Pandyas from Sadaavarman Parakrama Pandya and his next generations were crowned in the Adheenam Mutt in Kasi Viswanathar temple. During the same period, some Pandyas ruled with Tirunelveli as their capital. Kayatharu, Vadakkuvalliyur, and Ukkirankottai are some of their major cities. Inscriptions on them are found in Tenkasi's Kasi Viswanathar temple, Brahmadesam, Cheranmadevi, Ambasamudram, Kalakkad and Pudukkottai. The last Pandyan king to be known in the history of the Pandyas was Kolakonda, who was also among the Tenkasi Pandyas.

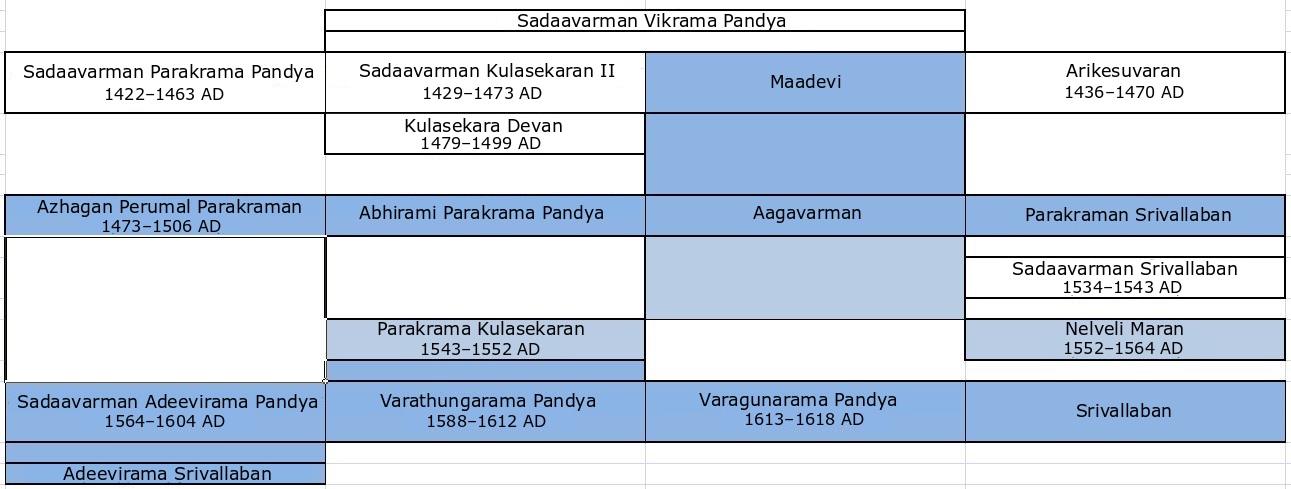
Sadaavarman Parakrama Pandya and his descendants who ruled Tenkasi.

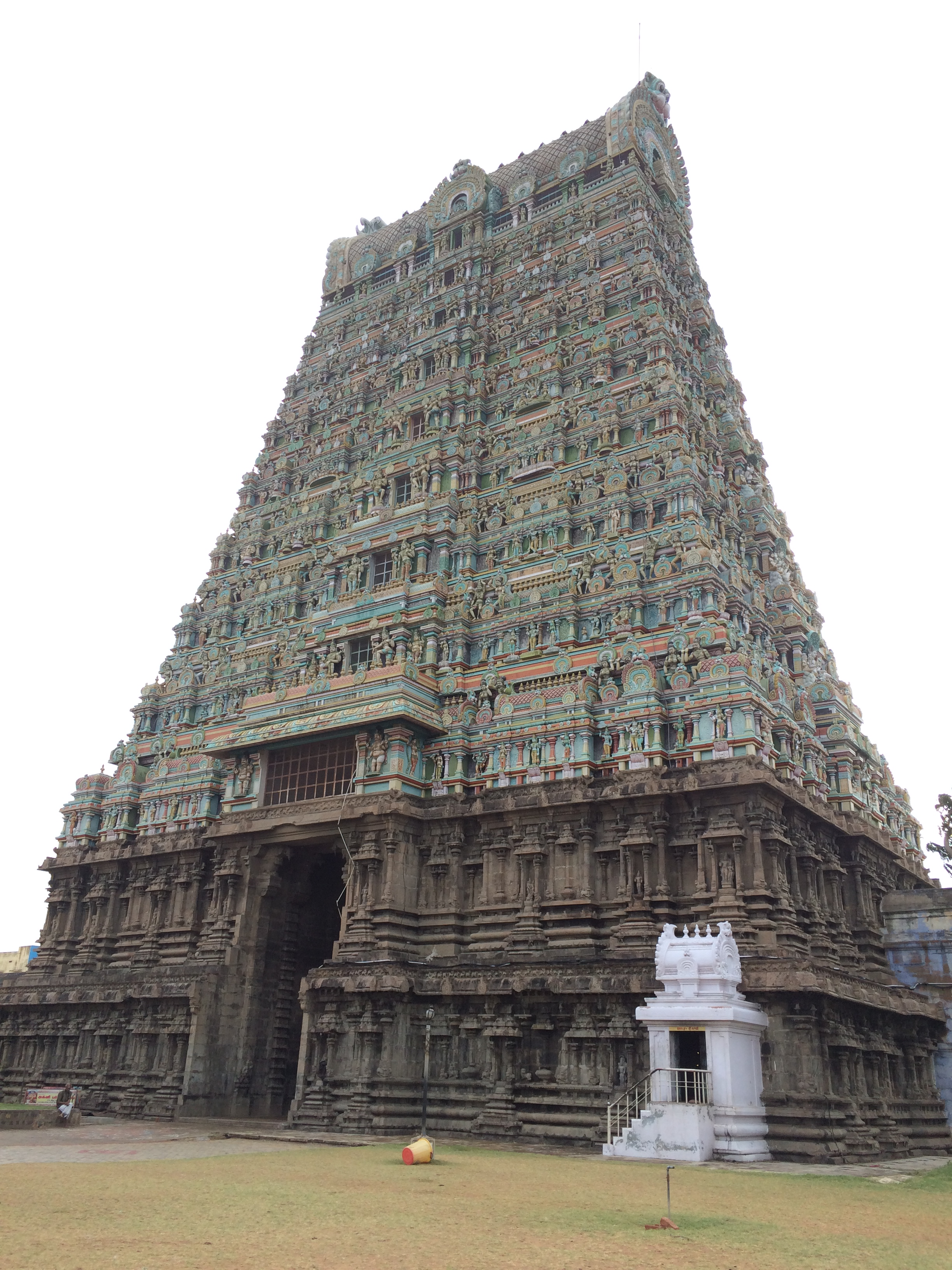
Gateway of the Kasi Viswanathar temple in Tenkasi

All the Pandyas of the Varagunarama Pandya period were under the Vijayanagara Empire and paid them tribute. However, other sources invariably mention that though the Madurai Nayakas were in-charge of Madurai, from time to time, they were opposed by and had skirmishes with the Tenkasi Pandyans, who are also said to have had intermittent control of Madurai.The Tenkasi Pandyas ruled Tenkasi, Thirunelveli and northern Kanyakumari regions as independent sovereign ruling dynasty from 1422CE till 1499CE.The Tenkasi Pandyas also had imperial ambitions, fought some wars, conquered territories outside their terrain. This is proven by the fact that the last Tenkasi Pandyan king bore the title "Kollamkondan", which means the one who conquered Kollam in Malayalam country.

== Pandyas losing Madurai ==
Although the Vijayanagara Empire and the Nayaks ruled Madurai after the 14th century, they were occasionally opposed by the Pandyas. Sometimes they have ruled Madurai. Prominent among them were Saadavarman Vikrama Pandya (1401 – 1422 AD) and his son, Arikesari Parakrama Pandya. They had built 32 forts around Madurai. Later, when Vishwanatha Nayakkar became the Madurai Mandalasuvaran, he feared of Pandya resurgence in Madurai. He divided Madurai into 72 districts, including 16 districts of those against to the Pandyas. He gave them positions and made them separate from the Pandyas. This made Pandyas to lose Madurai forever.

== Tenkasi's origin ==
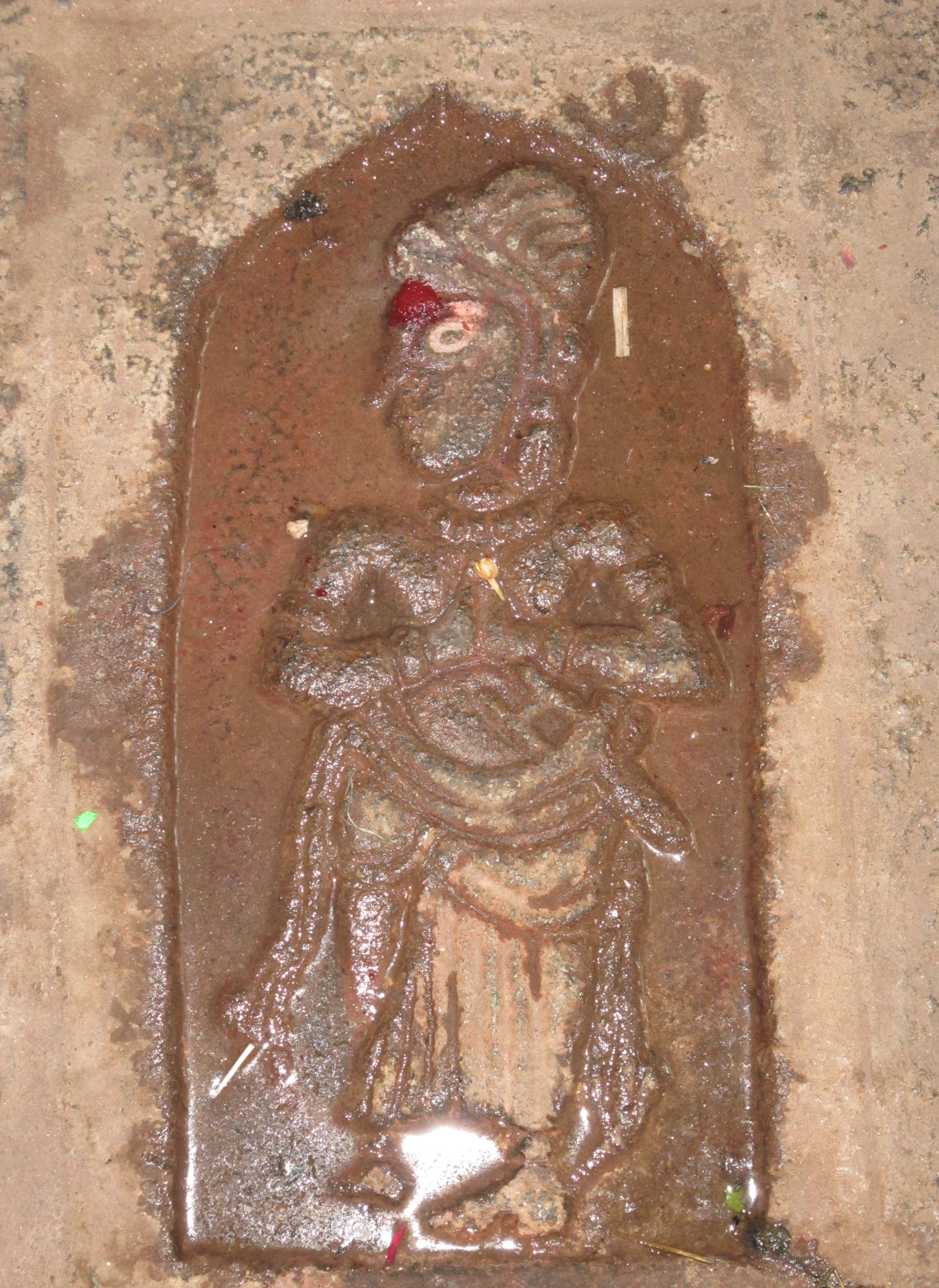
King Saadavarman Parakrama Pandya was the first Pandya king to be crowned after Tenkasi was established as Pandya's capital. Since he was unable to complete the construction of Tenkasi temple and there was a prophecy telling that the temple would collapse the next day, he requested the devotees to help restore the temple. He promised to accept the offerings of everyone and bow down to their feet. Accordingly, to fulfill that promise, he had put his image in the gateway of the temple.

Shenbagapozhil in Tamil means "champak tree-lined rainforest". In the fifteenth century, Lord Shiva is said to have had appeared in the dream of King Parakrama Pandya, who ruled the Shenbagapozhil area. In that dream, he was said that a lingam worshiped by the Pandya's ancestors was in the Shenbaga forest. He was said that ants could be found crawling out of their fort and if they followed the ants, the lingam could be found. He was also told by Shiva to construct a temple there. The reason is the order from Shiva, "Shiva devotees in the south die before reaching Kashi on their way to Varanasi in the north. So for them to get my grace, build a city equaling that of Varanasi in the south". Obeying his words, King Parakrama Pandya built the Tenkasi gopuram for his ancestor-worshiped lingam. The word Tenkasi translates to "South Kashi" ("ten" or "then" meaning south in Tamil). The town was called the Tenkasi after the temple.

=== Other names ===
Tenkasi was known by 16 names before the reign of Sadaavarman Parakrama Pandya. They were

1. Sachhithanapuram
2. Muttuthantavanallur
3. Anantakkuthanur
4. Saivamuthur
5. Tenpuliyur
6. Kuyinkudi
7. Sittharvasam
8. Senpagapozhil
9. Sivamavoor
10. Sathamaatharoor
11. Sithiramoolathanam
12. Mayilaikudi
13. Palalinkapaadi
14. Vasanthakudi
15. Kosigai
16. Sitharpuri

=== Cityscape ===
The Pandya city of Tenkasi was centered around the Kasi Viswanathar temple. There were square-shaped streets in succession around the temple. The Tenkasi Pandyas were based on a fortress known as Ukkirankottai.

== List of Tenkasi Pandya kings ==
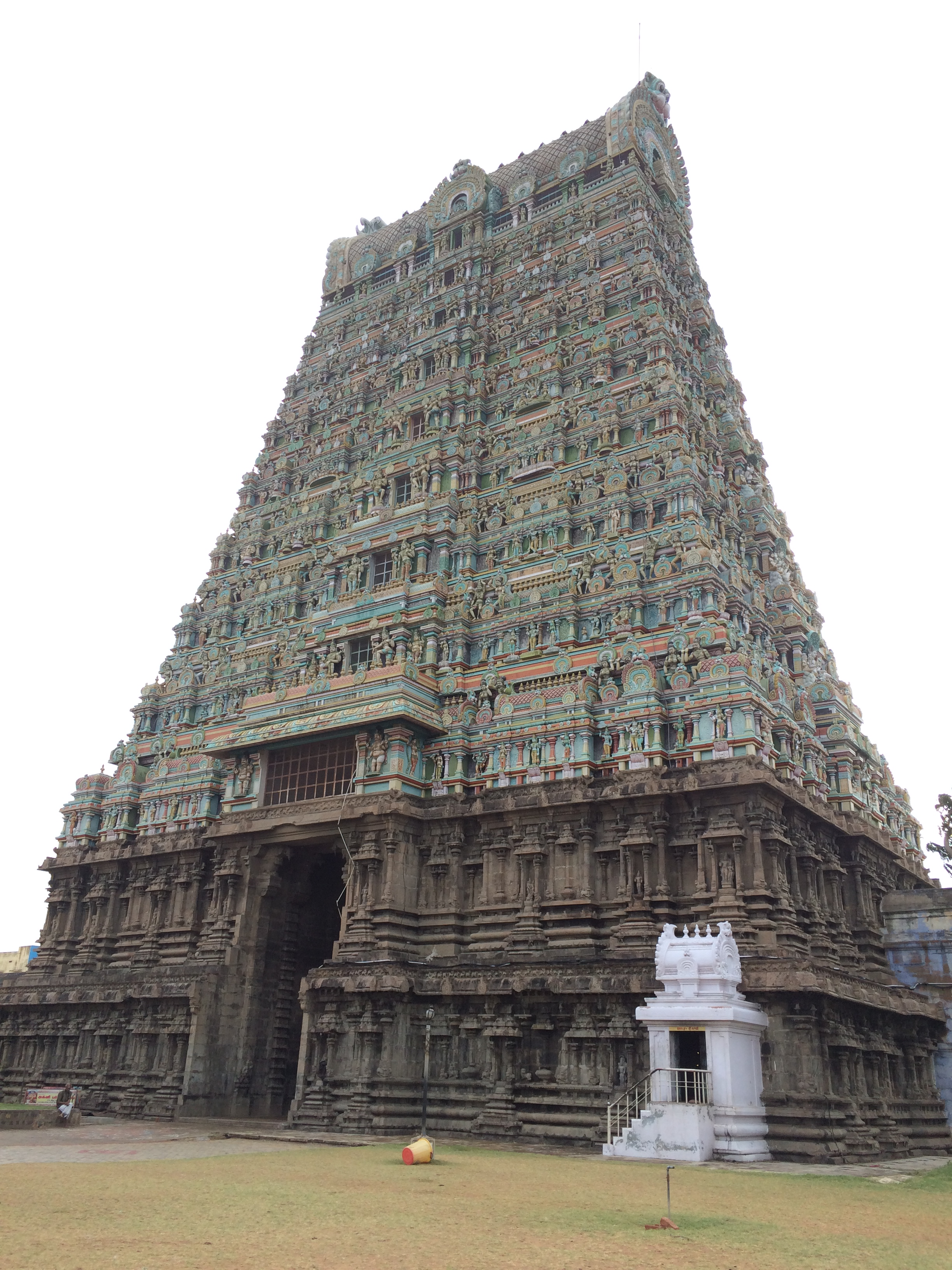
Gateway of the Kasi Viswanathar temple in Tenkasi

List of Pandyas who ruled with Tenkasi as the capital.

No	King	Period
1	Sadaavarman Parakrama Pandya	1422–1463 AD
2	Kulasekara Pandiyan III	1429–1473 AD
3	Aksharan Perumal Parakrama Pandya	1473–1506 AD
4	Kulasekara Pandya	1479–1499 AD
5	Sadaverman Sewallapa Pandya	1534–1543 AD
6	Parakrama Kulasekaran	1543–1552 AD
7.	Nelveli Maran	1552–1564 AD
8.	Sadaavarman Adeevirama Pandya	1564–1604 AD
9.	Varathuranga Pandya	1588–1612 AD
10.	Varagunarama Pandya	1613–1618 AD
11.	Kollankondan (Pandya Dynasty)	(N.A.)

== Proofs ==
=== Historic text ===
Pandya Kulodayam is a Pandya history book written by Mandalakavi (zonal poet) of the Tenkasi Pandya period. The information it contained were:

1. The first Pandya king to be crowned with Tenkasi as the capital was the Sadaavarman Parakrama Pandya.
2. All the Pandya kings after him were crowned in the Tenkasi temple. They were inscribed in the temple's inscriptions.
3. The last Pandya king, King Kolakkondan, was killed in approximately AD 1650.

=== Numismatics ===
Although the Pandya kings who ruled Tenkasi ruled only marginal lands, they had issued coins in their name. The coins with the name of King Sadayarvarman Kulasekara Pandya II's son Aagavarman, were found.

== Art ==
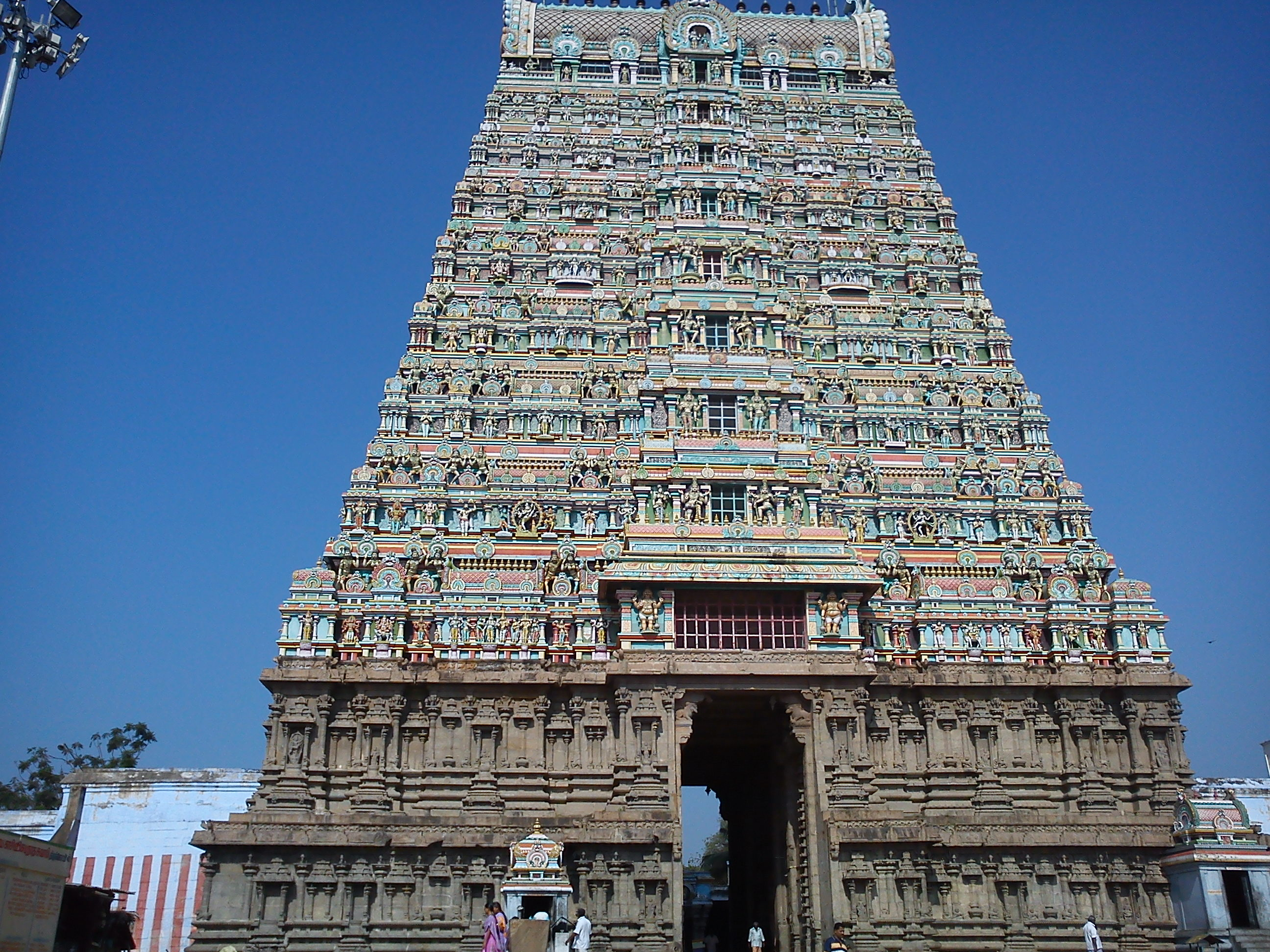
Kasi Vishwanathar temple's Rajagopuram (Main gateway)

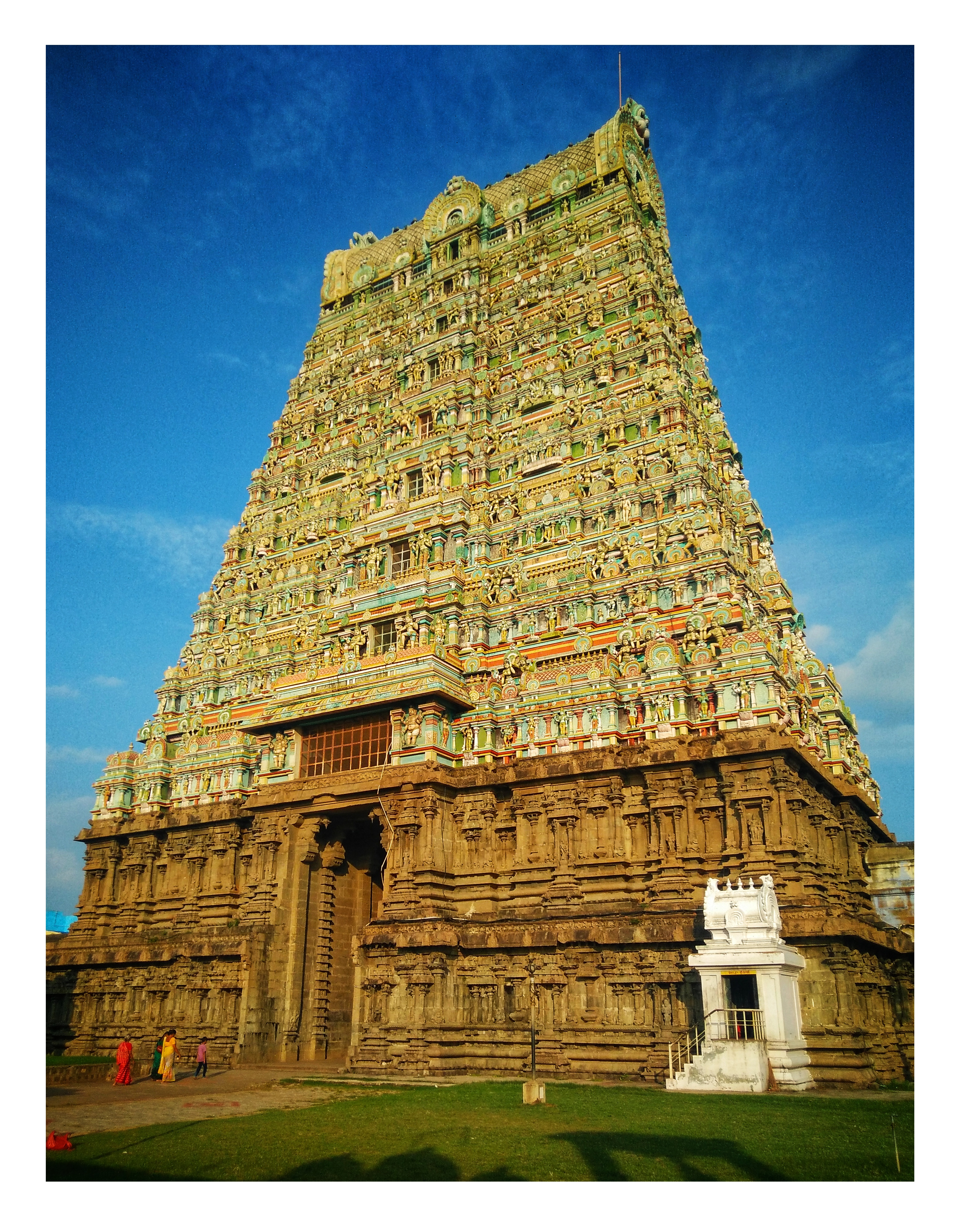
Another view of the Rajagopuram

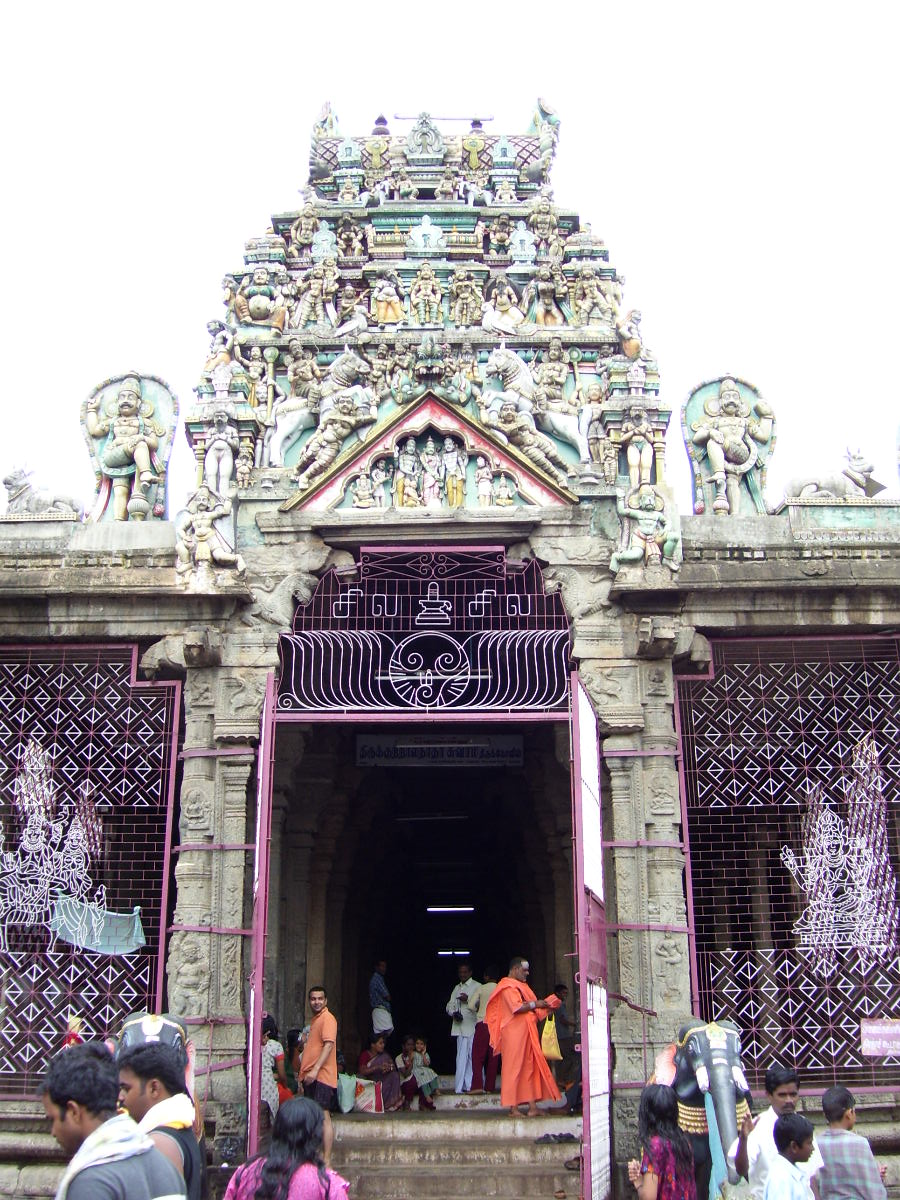
Thirukutralam temple

=== Notable temples ===
No.	Temple	Note
1	Kasi Viswanathar temple	The origin period is unknown. Temple towers and shrines were erected during the reign of Saadavarman Parakrama Pandya.
2	Thirukutralam temple	The origin period is unknown. Temple towers and shrines were erected during the reign of Saadavarman Parakrama Pandya.
3	Kulasekaranath Temple	Built during the reign of Saadavarman Ativirama Pandya.

=== Temple's specialty ===
==== Vayuvasal (Sadaavarman Parakrama Pandya entrance) ====
- The temple's gopuram is known as Vayuvasal (Gateway of the air). The breeze from Vaigai river comes through this gateway. This makes it difficult to enter in the Tamil month of Ādi. Outside of the Bala Subramainya temple, there are musical pillars.

==== Single-stone statues ====
Some of the sculptural masterpieces of Tamil Nadu can be seen in the Thiruoolaka Mandapam at the Swami sannathi. There are 16 statues in the hall.

1. Agni Veerapathirar
2. Rathidevi
3. Maha Thandavam
4. Urthuva Thandavam
5. Kalidevi
6. Mahavishnu
7. Manmathan
8. Veerapathirar
9. Paavai
10. Paavai
11. Tharman
12. Beeman
13. Arjunan
14. Nakulan
15. Sahadevan
16. Karnan

The above statues are all sculpted out of single stone with subtle workmanship by the Pandya-era sculptors.

==== Tunnels ====
The entrance to the tunnel is still visible in the big temple. It is said to have four tunnels.

1. The Avur people still say that the tunnel to the east is going to Vindhankottai in Sundarapandiapuram.
2. Another route is said to pass through the Kulasekara Nathar Temple.

=== Thirumalapuram Paintings ===
There is a cave temple on the Thirumalapuram hill near Tenkasi. It is on the way to Serndamaram village near Kadayanallur. The temple has paintings of the Pandya period. The first to discover these paintings was scholar Duprai. These colour cave temple paintings exemplify the art of the Pandya period.

=== Literature ===
Tenkasi Pandyas had also contributed to Tamil literature.

Year	Capital	Pandya king	Texts	Guru (Master)
1560 –1600	Karuvai, later Tenkasi	Varakunaraman	Vaayu Sangeethai, Ilinga Puranam	Akora Shivam Swami Devar (also known as Kulasekara Pandya)
1588 – 1613(?)	Karuvai	Varathurangaraman	Pramothira Kaandam, Karuvai Anthathi, Kokogam	Vembathur Eesana Munivar
1564 – 1610	Tenkasi	Ativiraraman known as Seevalaraman	Naidatham, Kashi Kandam, Koorma Puranam, Vetriverkai	Swamidevar

Apart from these, a historical book called Pandya Kulodayam was also written by Mandalakavi during the Tenkasi Pandyas period.
