= Pappakudi block =

Pappakudi block is a revenue block in the Tirunelveli district of Tamil Nadu, India. It has a total of 15 panchayat villages. Pappakudi a village located in the banks of Thamirabarani river.

The Indian village Pappakudi is located in the taluk of cheranmadevi district of Tirunelveli, in the State of Tamil Nadu.

About Pappakudi

Pappakudi is a village in cheramadevi Taluk in Tirunelveli District of Tamil Nadu State, India. It is located 21 km towards west from District Headquarters Tirunelveli. It is a taluk headquarters. Rengasamudram ( 2 km), Athalanallur (3 km), Sengulam (4 km), North Ariyanayagipuram (5 km), Vellanguli (6 km) are the nearby villages to Pappakudi. Pappakudi is surrounded by Ambasamudram Taluk towards west, Cheranmahadevi Taluk towards east, Vikramasingapuram Taluk towards west, Alangulam Taluk towards north. Vikramasingapuram, Tirunelveli, Surandai, Tenkasi are the nearby Cities to Pappakudi Demographics of Pappakudi. Tamil is the local language here.

Location details

Taluk Name : cheranmadevi
District : Tirunelveli
State : Tamil Nadu
Language : Tamil and Malayalam, Sauraastra, English, Telugu and Hindi
Time zone: IST (UTC+5:30)
Elevation / Altitude: 65 meters. Above Sea level
Telephone Code / Std Code: 04634.

Nearby railway stations

- Ambasamudram- 8 km
- Kallidaikurichi- 8 km
- Charanmahadevi- 10 km

Places to visit

- Tirunelveli- 21 km
- Courtallam- 36 km
- Ponmudi- 47 km
- Thenmala- 59 km
- Trivandrum- 74 km

Pappakudi Nearby Places

A few nearby places of Pappakudi are listed below for your reference:

Taluks

- Pappakudi- 0 km
- Ambasamudram- 6 km
- Cheranmahadevi- 11 km
- Alangulam- 16 km

Airports

- Tuticorin Airport- 65 km
- Trivandrum International Airport- 78 km
- Madurai Airport- 154 km
- Kochi Airport- 222 km

District headquarters

- Tirunelveli- 21 km
- Thiruvananthapuram- 73 km
- Tuticorin- 79 km
- Kanniyakumari- 80 km.

Pappakudi population

Total population: 26,651
Households: 11,855

Population by sex

Males: 13,427
Females: 13,224
Children: 679

Pappakudi village code is 1608500.

Villages in Pappakudi

Haripuram, Ilanthai Kulam, Indranagar, Keela Pappakudi, Nanthanthattai, Pudugramam, Rasthavoor, Gandhinagar, Kumarasamy puram, Mela Pappakudi, Paruthivaikulam, Thulukka patty, Kasi Dharmam, Sivakamipuram, Idaikal.

Latitude: 8.750010;
Longitude : 77.507566.

Google Map of Pappakudi View Larger Map of Pappakudi
