= Nanguneri taluk =

Coordinates: 8.48°N 77.67°E

Nanguneri Taluk is a taluk of Tirunelveli District of the Indian state of Tamil Nadu. The headquarters is the town of Nanguneri.

== Demographics ==
According to the 2011 census, the taluk of Nanguneri had a population of 225,457 with 110,826 males and 114,631 females. There were 1,034 women for every 1,000 men. The taluk had a literacy rate of 77.48%. Child population in the age group below 6 years were 11,551 Males and 11,066 Females.
