= Palayamkottai taluk =

Coordinates: 8.7166°N 77.7333°E

Palayamkottai taluk is a taluk of Tirunelveli district of the Indian state of Tamil Nadu. The headquarters is the town of Palayamkottai.

== Demographics ==
According to the 2011 census, the taluk of Palayamkottai had a population of 91,174 with 45,183 males and 45,991 females. There were 1018 women for every 1000 men. The taluk had a literacy rate of 75.23. Child population in the age group below 6 was 4,652 Males and 4,568 Females.
