= Thisayanvilai =

Taluk in Tamil Nadu

- Taluk
- Location in Tamil Nadu, India
- Coordinates: 8°20′10″N 77°51′52″E
- Country: India
- State: Tamil Nadu
- District: Tirunelveli

Population (2011)
  - Total: 23,702

Languages
  - Official: Tamil
- Time zone: UTC+5:30 (IST)
- PIN: 627657
- Telephone code: 04637
- Vehicle registration: TN-72V

Thisayanvilai is a special grade-town Panchayat. It is one of the taluks in Tirunelveli district in the Indian state of Tamil Nadu.

== Demographics ==
According to the 2011 census, Thisayanvilai has a population of 23,702. Males constitute 48% of the population and females 52%. Thisayanvilai has an average literacy rate of 91.12%, higher than the state average of 80.09. Male literacy is 94.10%, and female literacy is 88.22%. In Thisayanvilai, 11.35% of the population is under 6 years of age. Of the late, many from the district immigrate there, in search of better employment, making it an immigration hub.

== Industry ==
Being nearer to mineral-rich beaches, Thisayanvilai has one of India's largest Garnet and Ilmenite exporting companies named VV Minerals.
