= Vadakkuvalliyur =

Coordinates: 8°23′N 77°39′E

- Town
- Interactive map of Vadakkuvalliyur
- Country: India
- State: Tamil Nadu
- District: Tirunelveli

Population (2011)
  - Total: 29,417

Languages
  - Official: Tamil
- Time zone: UTC+5:30 (IST)

Vadakkuvalliyur is a Town in Tirunelveli district in the Indian state of Tamil Nadu.

== Demographics ==
As of 2001 India census, Vadakkuvalliyur had a population of 24,020. Males constitute 49% of the population and females 51%. Vadakkuvalliyur has an average literacy rate of 77%, higher than the national average of 59.5%: male literacy is 82%, and female literacy is 73%. In Vadakkuvalliyur, 11% of the population is under 6 years of age.

== See also ==
- Kizhavaneri
