= Tirunelveli taluk =

Taluk of Tirunelveli District, Tamil Nadu, India

Tirunelveli is a taluk of Tirunelveli District of the Indian state of Tamil Nadu. The headquarters is the city of Tirunelveli.

== Demographics ==
According to the 2011 census, the taluk of Tirunelveli had a population of 643,341 with 317,970 males and 325,371 females. There were 1,023 women for every 1,000 men. The taluk had a literacy rate of 79.52%. Child population in the age group below 6 was 31,237 Males and 29,765 Females.
