= Manoor block =

Manoor or Manur block is a revenue block in the Tirunelveli district of Tamil Nadu, India. It has a total of 41 panchayat villages.
