= Manur taluk (Tirunelveli) =

Manur taluk (Tamil :மானூர் வட்டம்) is one of the 8 taluks of Tirunelveli district of Tamil Nadu. The taluk is Administered by the Tahsildar office located in Manur. Manur Panchayat union is in this taluk. There are 32 Revenue Villages in the newly created manur taluk. The headquarters of the taluk is Manur. This taluk consists of 3 Firka taluks namely Manur, Thalayuthu and Vannikonendal.
