= Tirunelveli district =

- District of Tamil Nadu
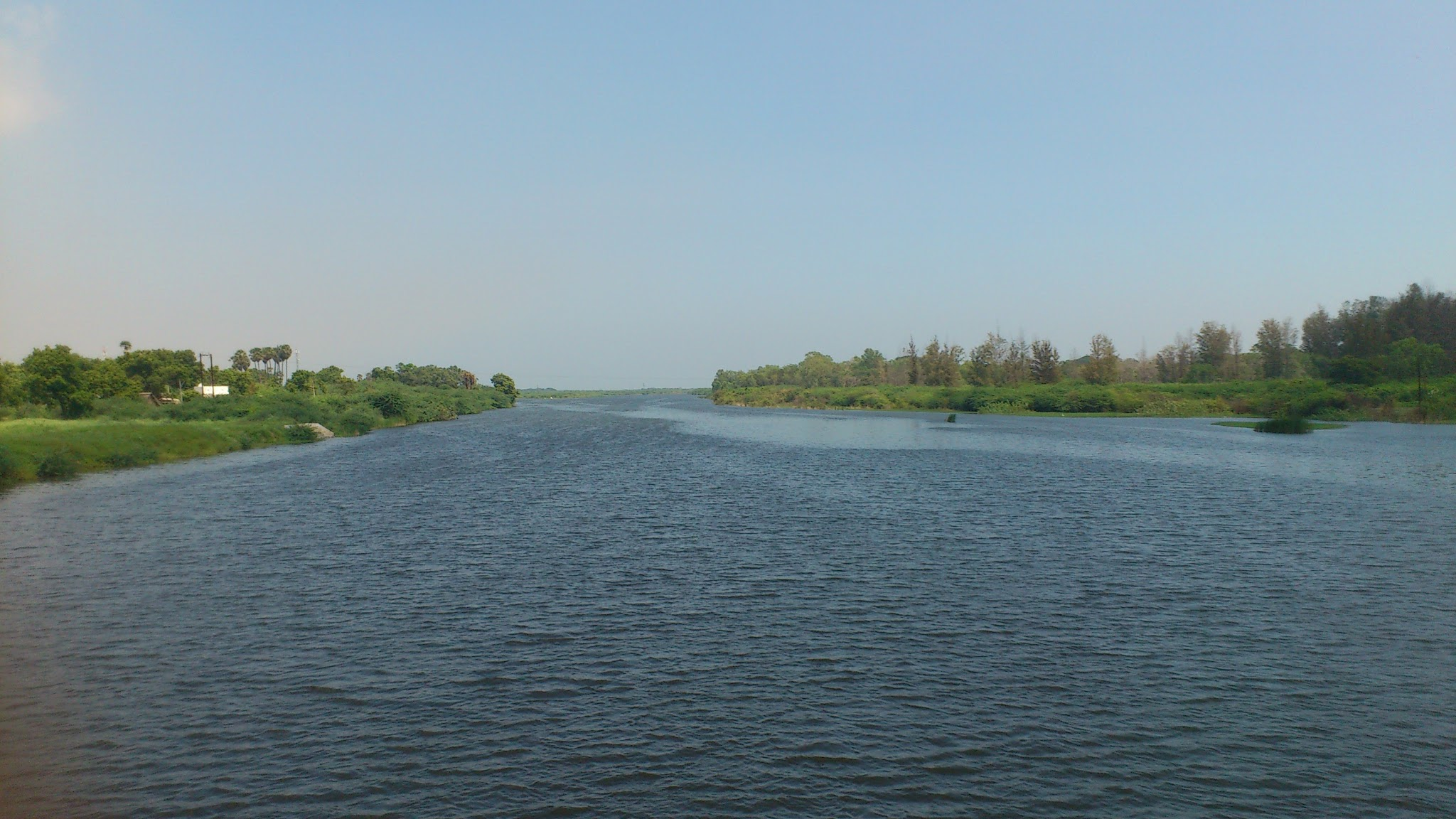
- Thamirabarani River from Authoor Bridge

- Location in Tamil Nadu
- Tirunelveli district
- Coordinates: 8.65°N 77.383°E
- Country: India
- State: Tamil Nadu
- District formed on: 1 September 1790; 236 years ago
- Headquarters: Tirunelveli
- Talukas: Ambasamudram, Nanguneri, Palayamkottai, Radhapuram, Tirunelveli, Cheranmahadevi, Manur, Thisayanvilai

Government
  - Type: District Administration
  - Body: Tirunelveli District Collectorate
  - Collector: Thiru Anand Mohan IAS, IAS
  - Superintendent of Police: P.Saravanan, I.P.S.

Area
  - Total: 3,907 km^{2} (1,509 sq mi)
  - Rank: 1

Population (2011)
  - Total: 1,636,438
  - Density: 410.5/km^{2} (1,063/sq mi)

Languages
  - Official: Tamil
- Time zone: UTC+5:30 (IST)
- PIN: 627***
- Telephone code: 0462
- Vehicle registration: TN-72 (Tirunelveli City) and TN-72A (Valliyur Region) and TN-76A (Ambasamudram)
- Coastline: 48.9 kilometres (30.4 mi)
- Largest city: Tirunelveli
- Sex ratio: M-49%/F-51% ♂/♀
- Literacy: 82.90% (2011)
- Legislature type: elected
- Legislature Strength: 5
- Precipitation: 814.8 millimetres (32.08 in)
- Avg. summer temperature: 37 °C (99 °F)
- Avg. winter temperature: 22 °C (72 °F)
- Website: tirunelveli.nic.in

Tirunelveli district is one of the 38 districts of Tamil Nadu state in India. It is the 17th-largest district in terms of area with Tirunelveli as its headquarters. The district was formed on 1 September 1790 by the British East India Company (on behalf of the British government) and comprised the present Tirunelveli and Thoothukudi, Tenkasi and parts of Virudhunagar and Ramanathapuram district. As of 2011, the undivided district (along with Tenkasi) had a population of 30,77,233.

== History ==
Historical population
Year	Pop.	±% p.a.
1901	982,363	—
1911	1,061,965	+0.78%
1921	1,154,547	+0.84%
1931	1,242,552	+0.74%
1941	1,376,604	+1.03%
1951	1,547,268	+1.18%
1961	1,677,309	+0.81%
1971	1,972,220	+1.63%
1981	2,203,462	+1.11%
1991	2,481,880	+1.20%
2001	2,703,492	+0.86%
2011	3,077,233	+1.30%

Under the rule of the Pandyan Dynasty, the district was known as Thenpandiyanadu. Tirunelveli was the second Capital of the Pandyan Dynasty. The Chola dynasty then named it Mudikonda Cholamandalam. The Madurai Nayaks called it Tirunelveli Seemai. Under the British East India Company, it was Tinnevelly district, which included the modern Tirunelveli and Thoothukudi districts and parts of the Virudhunagar and Ramanathapuram districts.

In 1910, Ramanathapuram District was formed from portions of the Madurai and Tirunelveli Districts, which comprised portions of the modern Virudhunagar District.

After the Independence of India, Tirunelveli District was bifurcated on 20 October 1986 to Nellai-Kattabomman district (Tirunelveli) and Chidambaranar district (Tuticorin). Subsequently, the Government of Tamil Nadu decided to name each district according to the name of the headquarters town, so the region's name changed from Tirunelveli-Kattabomman to Tirunelveli.

On 18 July 2019 the district was again bifurcated to form a new Tenkasi district with Tenkasi as its district capital.

== Geography ==
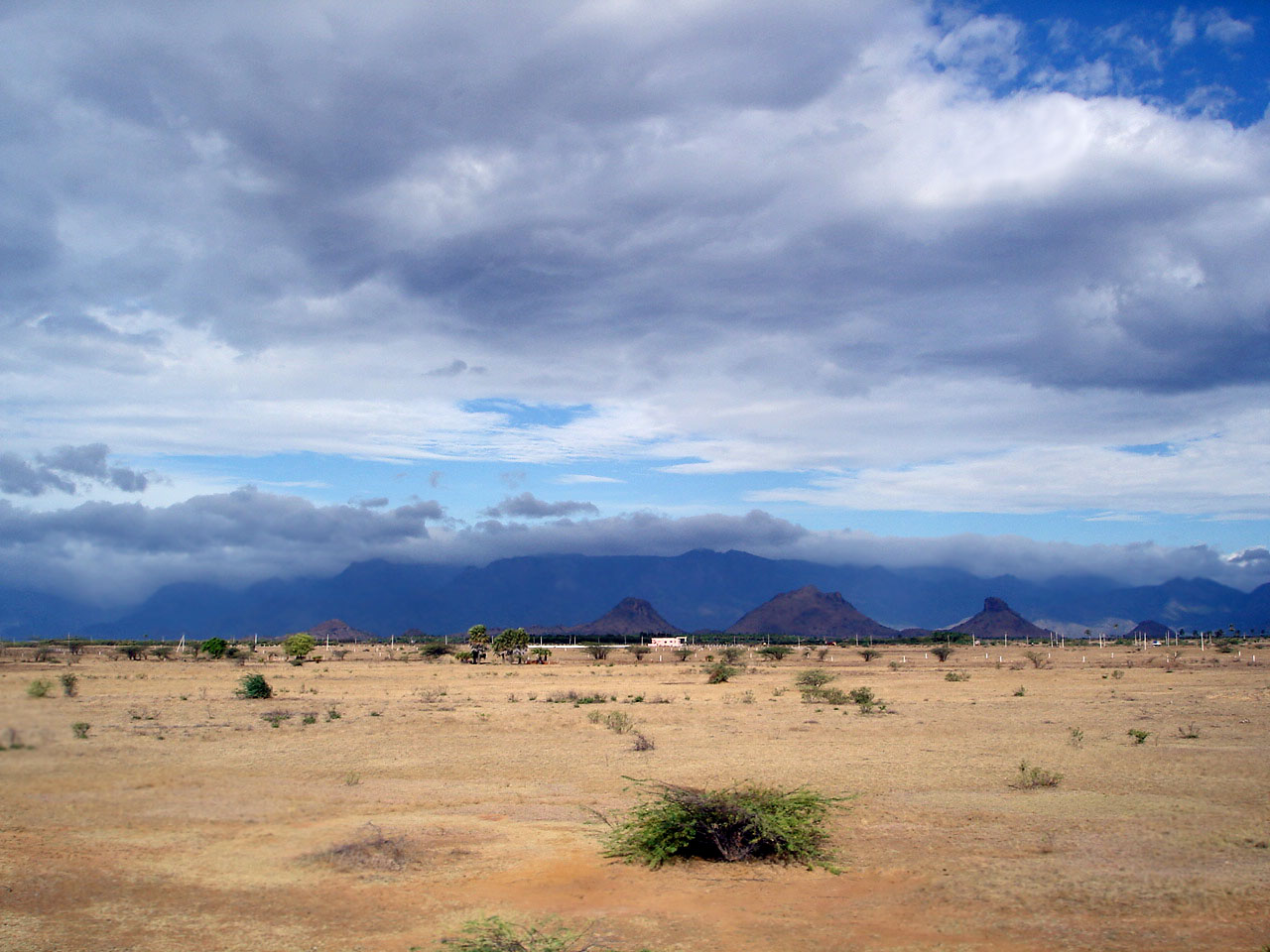
The Agasthiyamalai hills cut off Tirunelveli from the southwest monsoon, creating a rainshadow region.

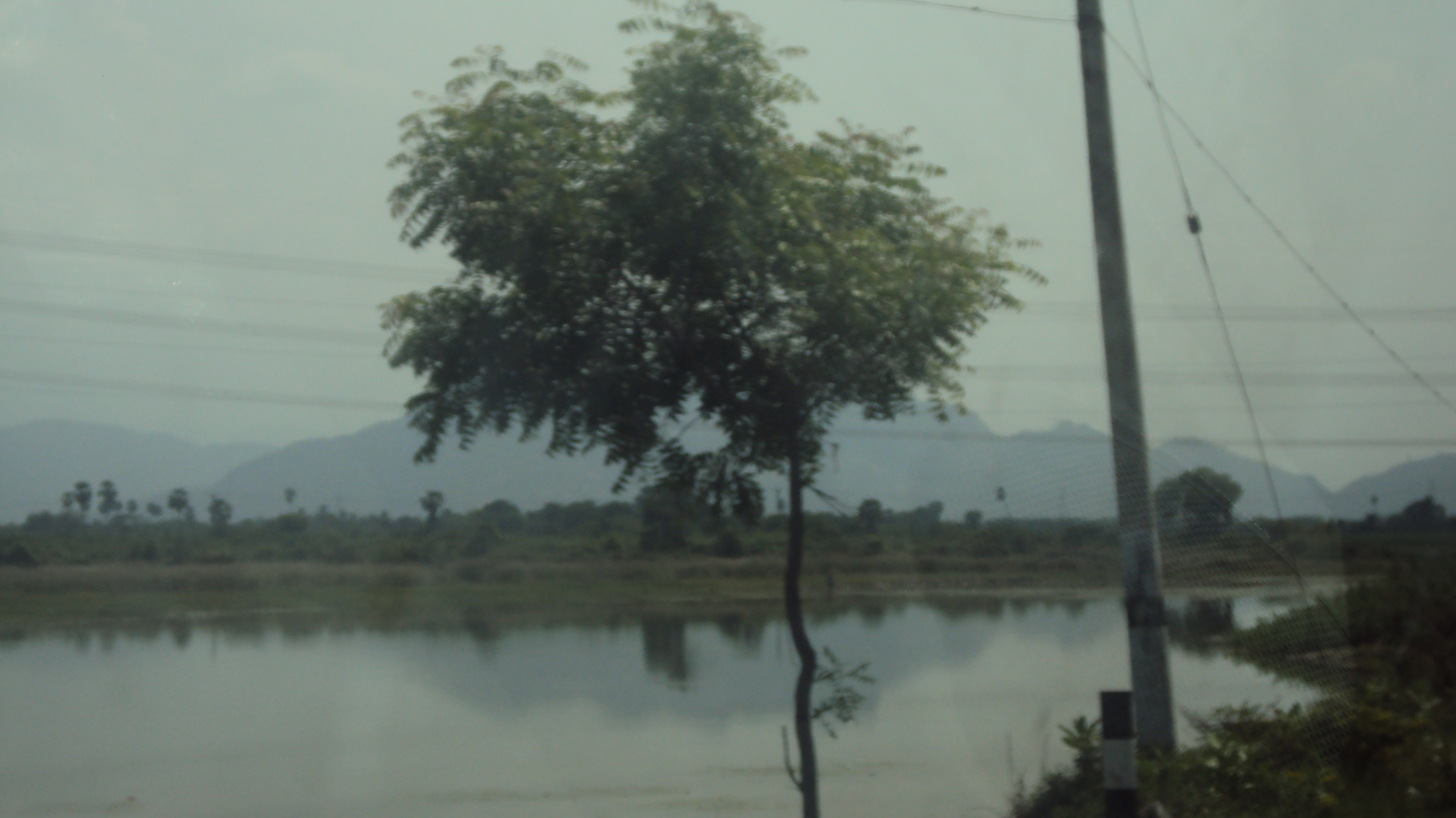
Podhigai mountain's shadow falling on Poovankurichi lake.

The district is located in the southern part of Tamil Nadu. It has borders with Tenkasi district to the north, Kanyakumari District to the south and Thoothukudi District to the east and Thiruvananthapuram district and Kollam district of Kerala to the west. The district covers an area of 3,907 square kilometres (1,509 sq mi). It lies between 8°05' and 9°30' north latitude and 77°05' and 78°25' east longitude.

== Climate ==
Tirunelveli has rainfall in all seasons (953.1 millimetres (37.52 in) in 2005 and 2006), and benefits from both the northeast and southwest monsoons. Most precipitation came from the northeast monsoon (548.7 millimetres (21.60 in)) followed by the southwest monsoon (147.8 millimetres (5.82 in)) and summer rains (184.2 millimetres (7.25 in)). The district is irrigated by several rivers originating in the Western Ghats, such as the Pachaiyar River, which flows into the perennial Thamirabarani River. The Thamirabarani and Manimuthar Rivers have many dams, with reservoirs providing water for irrigation and power generation. The Thamirabarani River provides consistent irrigation to a large agricultural area.

== Revenue Divisions and Taluks ==
Tirunelveli Revenue Division: Tirunelveli, Palayamkottai, Manur

Cheranmahadevi Revenue Division: Cheranmadevi, Ambasamudram, Nanguneri, Radhapuram, Thisayanvilai

New Proposals for taluks

1. Pappakudi
2. Kalakkad
3. Valliyur

=== Municipal Corporation ===
1. Tirunelveli

=== Municipalities ===
1. Ambasamudram
2. Vikramasingapuram
3. Kalakkad

=== Town Panchayats ===
1. Cheranmahadevi
2. Eruvadi
3. Gopalasamudram
4. Kallidaikurichi
5. Manimutharu
6. Melacheval
7. Moolakaraipatti
8. Mukkudal
9. Nanguneri
10. Naranammalpuram
11. Panagudi
12. Pathamadai
13. Sankarnagar
14. Thirukkurungudi
15. Thisayanvilai
16. Veeravanallur
17. Valliyur (Vadakkuvalliyur)

=== Proposed Municipalities ===
1. Cheranmahadevi
2. Nanguneri
3. Valliyur (Vadakkuvalliyur)
4. Panagudi
5. Thisayanvilai

=== Proposed Town Panchayats ===
1. Manur
2. Radhapuram
3. Pappakudi

=== Panchayat Unions / Blocks ===
1. Palayamkottai
2. Manur
3. Pappakudi
4. Cheranmahadevi
5. Ambasamudram
6. Nanguneri
7. Kalakadu
8. Radhapuram
9. Valliyoor

== Politics ==
District	No.	Constituency	Name	Party	Alliance	Remarks
Tirunelveli	224	Tirunelveli	R. S. Murughan	TVK	TVK+	
Tirunelveli	225	Ambasamudram	Esakki Subaya	AIADMK	AIADMK+	Supported TVK
Tirunelveli	225	Ambasamudram	Vacant			On 26 May 2026, resigned from office and officially joined TVK
Tirunelveli	226	Palayamkottai	M. Abdul Wahab	DMK	SPA	
Tirunelveli	227	Nanguneri	Reddiarpatti V. Narayanan	TVK	TVK+	
Tirunelveli	228	Radhapuram	Sathish Christopher	TVK	TVK+	

== Demographics ==
According to 2011 census, Tirunelveli district (undivided) had a population of 3,077,233 with a sex-ratio of 1,023 females for every 1,000 males, much above the national average of 929. A total of 321,687 were under the age of six, constituting 164,157 males and 157,530 females. Scheduled Castes and Scheduled Tribes accounted for 18.51% and 0.33% of the population, respectively. The average literacy of the district was 73.88%, compared to the national average of 72.99%. The district had a total of 815,528 households. There were a total of 1,436,454 workers, comprising 107,943 cultivators, 321,083 main agricultural labourers, 215,667 in house hold industries, 626,714 other workers, 165,047 marginal workers, 7,772 marginal cultivators, 58,680 marginal agricultural labourers, 23,997 marginal workers in household industries and 74,598 other marginal workers.

Religions in residual Tirunelveli district (2011)
Religion	Percent
Hindu	78.83%
Christian	11.12%
Muslim	9.77%
Other or not stated	0.24%
Distribution of religions

After the bifurcation, Tirunelveli district had a population of 1,636,438. Bifurcated Tirunelveli district has 823,277 males and 813,161 females for a sex ratio of 988 females per 1000 males. 906,471 (55.39%) of the population lived in urban areas. Scheduled Castes and Scheduled Tribes made up 276,814 (16.92%) and 6,614 (0.40%) of the population respectively. Tamil is the predominant language, spoken by 98.34% of the population.

== Infrastructure ==
The district is well-connected by a network of roads and railways. Tirunelveli city serves as the main junction. It has no airports; the nearest airports are at Tuticorin (32 kilometres (20 mi) away), Madurai (150 kilometres (93 mi)) and Thiruvananthapuram (158 kilometres (98 mi)). The district has a total of 27 railway stations. The tables below list the lengths of roads and railways in the district.

Roads	National highways	State highways	Corporation and Municipalities Roads	Panchayat Union and Panchayat Road	Town Panchayat and Townships Road	Others (forest roads)
Length (km.)	174.824	442.839	1,001.54	1,254.10 and 1,658.35	840.399	114.450

Railways	Route length (km)	Track length (km)
Broad gauge	257.000	495.448
Meter gauge	0.000	0.000

Canals, wells, tanks and reservoirs are the sources of irrigation in the district. As of 2005–2006, the district had a total of 151 canals with a length of 499 kilometres (310 mi), 85,701 irrigation wells, 640 tube wells, eight reservoirs and 2,212 tanks. The district also has 21,776 wells used for domestic purposes.

Electricity is provided by the Tamil Nadu Electricity Board (TNEB). The district has hydroelectric power plants and windmills, with an installed capacity of 1,089.675 megawatt-hours (3,922.83 GJ); it is one of the major producers of wind energy in the state.

The Koodankulam Nuclear Power Plant project is being undertaken (with Russian aid) at the village of Koodankulam, 24 kilometres (15 mi) north-east of Kanyakumari. Koodankulam also has windmills used for power generation with installed capacity of 2,000 MW.

== Education and social development ==
Tirunelveli district has a literacy rate of 76.97%, which is above the state average. As of 2005–2006, the district had a total of 2,494 schools. It has one University, the Manonmaniam Sundaranar University (MSU). There are also four Government colleges, eleven Government-sponsored colleges and seven private colleges.

Tirunelveli has 25 arts and science colleges, 3 medical colleges, 20 engineering colleges and a law school. There are 1,501 primary schools, 431 middle schools and 185 higher secondary schools.

Manonmaniam Sundaranar University, which was established in 1990, has a network of 102 affiliated colleges. In 1878, there were two colleges in the district: the Madurai Diraviam Thayumanavar Hindu College and St. John's College. The first college for women, Sarah Tucker college was established in 1895. Of the 17 arts colleges in the district, eight are co-educational institutions, five are for women and four for men. The colleges in Tirunelveli district were originally affiliated with the University of Madras. Upon the creation of Madurai Kamaraj University in 1966, they were affiliated with MKU from 1966 to 1990. In 1990, their affiliation transferred to Manonmaniam Sundaranar University. The Regional Directorate of the Collegiate Education in the district was formed on 10 September 1979 to regulate colleges in Tirunelveli, Thoothukudi and Kanyakumari districts. In 1996, the Government Law College, Tirunelveli was established. Tirunelveli Medical College and its teaching hospital are located at Palayamkottai. It was established in 1965 and affiliated with the University of Madras. The Government Siddha Medical College was established at Palayamkottai on 30 November 1964. Technical education in the district dates to 1844, when Mrs. Caldwell, wife of Bishop Robert Caldwell began a school to teach girls lace-making at Idyangudi. The Government of Tamil Nadu set up a State Board of Technical Education and Training and a separate Directorate of Technical Education, effective 1 October 1957. Since then, the Directorate of Technical Education has assumed the administration of both engineering colleges and polytechnics. The Government College of Engineering was established in October 1981 to fulfill the needs of people in the southern region.

In 1986, the Revenue district of Tirunelveli was divided into Tirunelveli and Thoothukkudi districts. There are three education districts.

== Economy ==
Tirunelveli has been an agricultural area throughout its history. The district is a major producer of rice, coconuts, bananas, spices and forest-based products. The district is home to almost 50% of the buffalo population of Tamil Nadu. The district's livestock and poultry populations are as follows:

Cattle	Buffalo	Sheep	Goats	Pigs	Horses and Ponies	Donkeys	Rabbits	Total livestock	Total poultry
418,694	78,777	487,273	390,570	12,752	245	961	2401	67,877	1,218,583

Since it is a coastal district, Tirunelveli is also involved in fishery development and production. For the period 2005–2006, the total inland fish catch was 1,874 tonnes, and the total marine fish catch was 7,014 tonnes.

India Cements Limited is the third largest cement company in India, and began at Sankarnagar in Tirunelveli in 1949.

The district is also rich in minerals, with a total of 407 mines and quarries. Limestone, granite and garnet sand are some of the minerals mined or produced in the district. Major industries include textile, food and forestry products.

A Special Economic Zone (SEZ) was introduced at Nanguneri in 2001. A pharma park and windmill spare-parts and television-manufacturing factories have been planned in this SEZ. The Tamil Nadu Industrial Development Corporation (TIDCO) has planned a ₹700-crore high-tech industrial park in Nanguneri in association with INFAC Group and Axes Technologies Inc of the US. The state government is planning light manufacturing, design and assembly facilities, modern infrastructure facilities and amenities in this SEZ to attract a workforce from around the world.

== Recreation ==
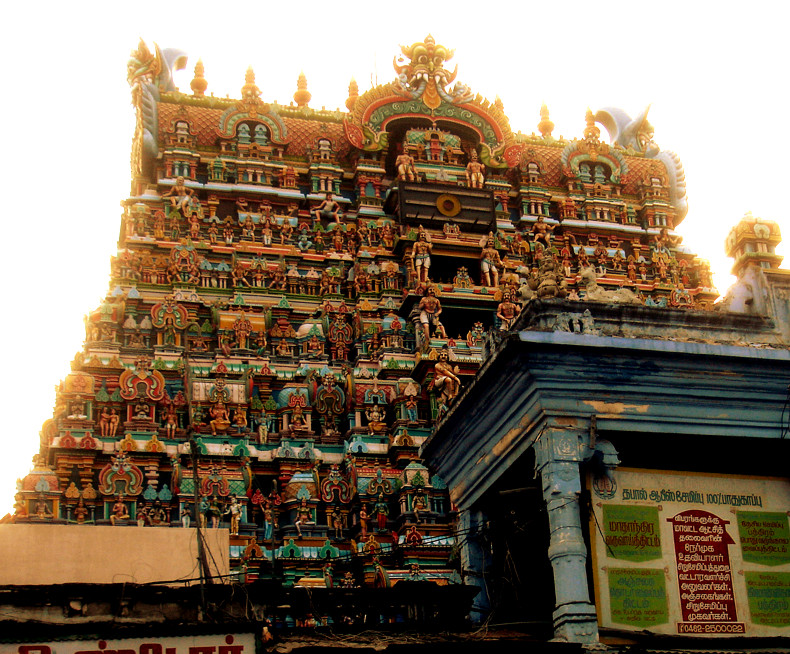
Nellaippar Temple

=== Manjolai Hills ===
Located between 1,000 metres (3,300 ft) and 1,500 metres (4,900 ft) of elevation, the Manjolai area is set deep within the Western Ghats within the Kalakad Mundanthurai Tiger Reserve in the Tirunelveli District. Located on top of the Manimuthar Dam and the Manimuthar Water Falls, the Manjolai area comprises tea plantations, small settlements, the Upper Kodaiyar Dam and a windy view point called Kuthiravetti.

The whole of the Manjolai Estates and the tea plantations are operated by The Bombay Burmah Trading Corporation Ltd on forest land leased by the Government of Tamil Nadu. There are three tea estates within the Manjolai area: Manjolai Estate, Manimutharu Estate and Oothu Estate. The Estates are located at elevations ranging from 700 metres (2,300 ft) to 1,300 metres (4,300 ft).

=== Tiger Reserve ===
The 900 square kilometres (350 sq mi) Kalakkad Mundanthurai Tiger Reserve was established in 1988. The reserve, at 8°39′N 77°23′E, is about 45 km west of Tirunelveli and is known as KMTR to forest and tiger researchers. Kalakkad is the nearest town. Kalakkad has a temple called Malainambi temple with a falls.

=== Papanasam ===
Papanasam is a famous picnic spot in Tirunelveli district in the Indian state of Tamil Nadu. It falls under the Ambasamudram Taluk and is situated 50 km (31 mi) from Tirunelveli. The site is popular for its tourists attractions such as the Thamirabarani River, Agasthiyar Falls, the Shiva Temple, Papanasam dam and the hydroelectric power plant.

=== Bird Sanctuary ===
A small village in the far south, Koonthankulam in Nanguneri Taluk of Tirunelveli District, is emerging as a new habitat for migratory birds. It is just 38 kilometres (24 mi) away. About 35 species of birds visit this village for breeding. The painted storks come from North India and East European Countries to this place. Similarly, the flamingoes which fly mainly from the Rann of Kutch have hatched and reared their young in the village.

=== Swamy Nellaiappar and Kanthimathi Ambal Temple ===
The Nellaiappar Temple is located at Tirunelveli. It is rooted in tradition and history, and is known for its musical pillars and other sculpted figures. The nearest airport is Tuticorin Airport (TCR) at Vagaikulam, a 30-minute drive (32 km) from Tirunelveli.

=== Melaseval Navaneethakrishnan Temple ===
The Navaneethakrishnan Temple at Melasevel Village, 16 km (9.9 mi) from Tirunelveli Town on the road leading to Ambasamudram, is around 730 years old. Adhithyavarneshwar Temple, devoted to Lord Shiva is also famous in this village. Twice a year, the sun's rays fall straight on the Lingam in the morning. Annual festivals are conducted at both these temples by people to whom the deity is kuladeivam (family deity). Dolotsavam utsavam on every month, on the day of Star ROHINI at the Navaneethakrishnan temple is quite familiar, and many childless couples take part in this pooja. Garuda Sevai is conducted on all four Saturdays of the Tamil month of Purattasi and attracts a large number of devotees from the neighbouring villages. With the kind permission of the HRE department of the State Government, the Melaseval Bhaktha Jana Seva Trust maintains the temple with daily rituals and regular poojas. The Uriyadi festival during Krishnashtami is an important event in this small village.

== Notable people ==
- T. V. Sundaram Iyengar, founder of TVS group
- Shiv Nadar, founder of HCL
- V. G. Panneerdas, founder of VGP group
- P. Rajagopal, founder of Saravana Bhavan
- N.Srinivasan, Indian industrialist. He is a former Chairman of the International Cricket Council (ICC) and former President of the BCCI, the governing body for cricket in India. He is also the managing director of India Cements Limited.
- S.Gnanathiraviam, Founder Annai Groups, Ex-Member of Parliament, Tirunelveli Constituency.

== Sports people ==
- Vijay Shankar (cricketer)

== Gallery ==
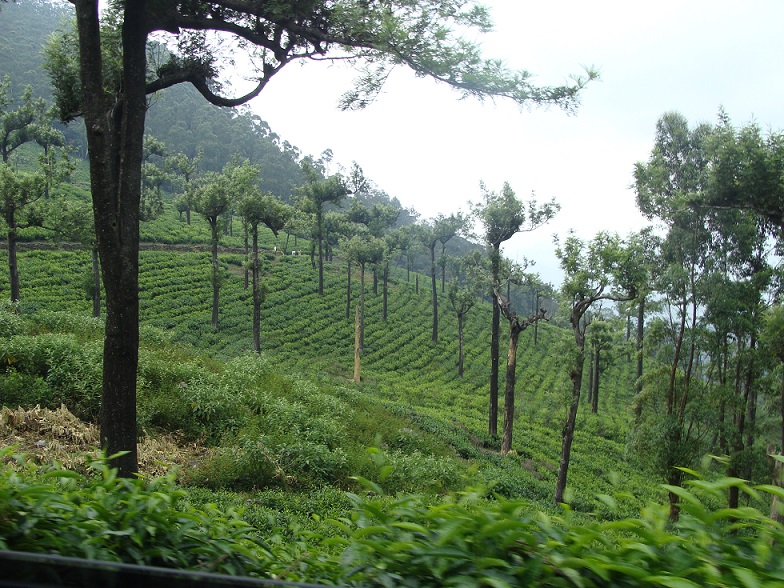
Manjolai hills

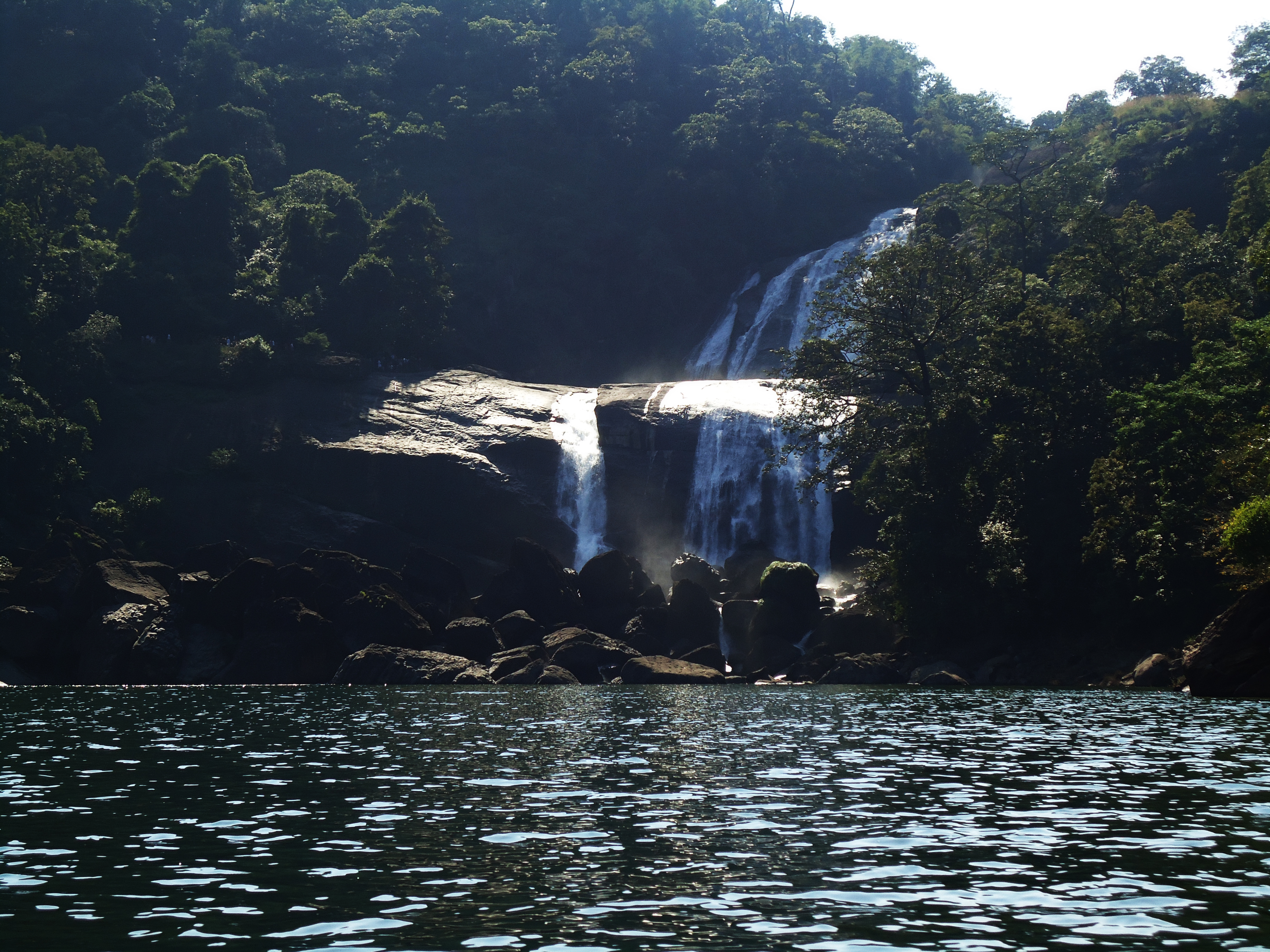
Vanatheertham falls at Papanasam

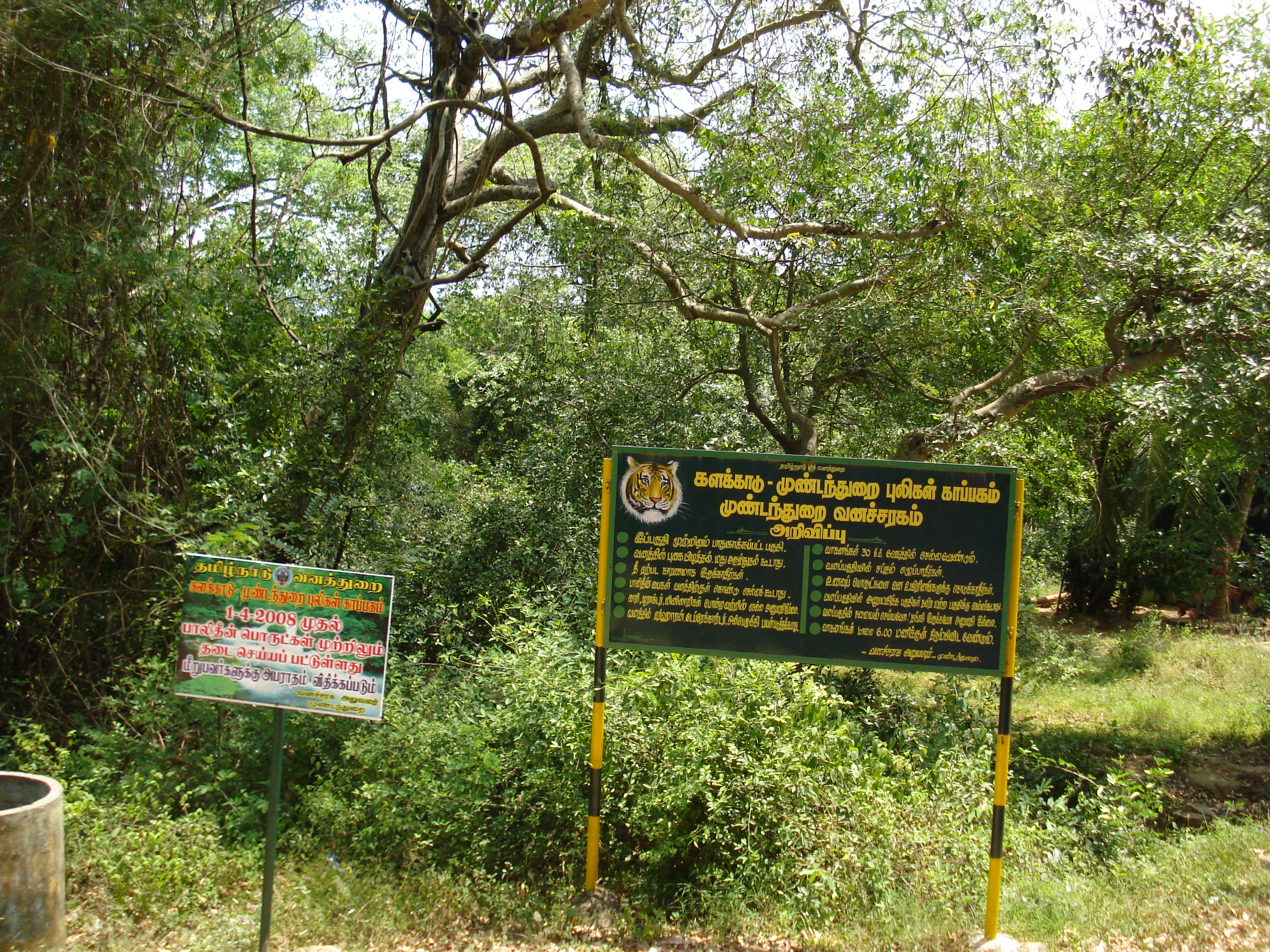
Kalakkad Mundanthurai Tiger Reserve

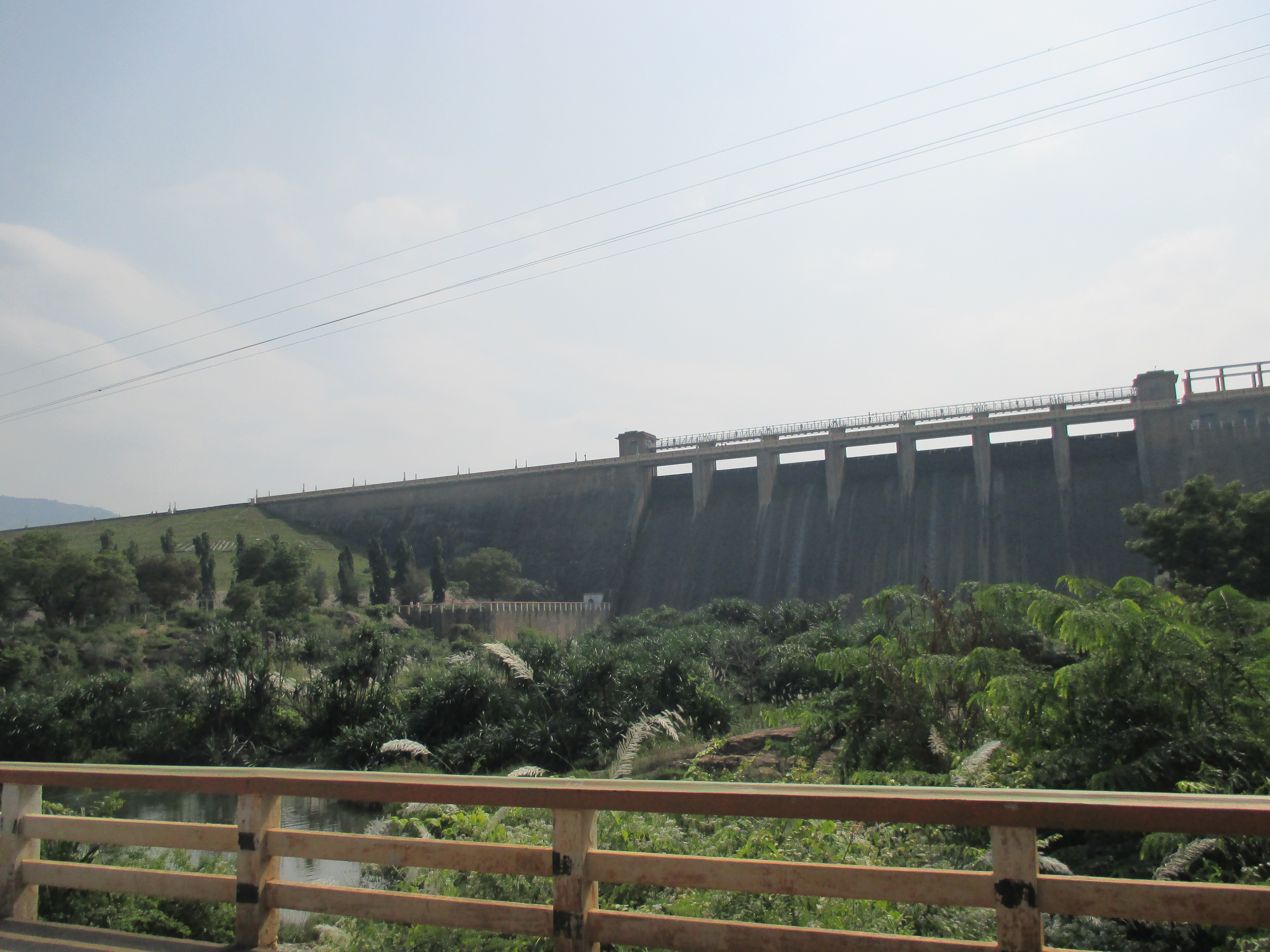
Manimuthar Dam

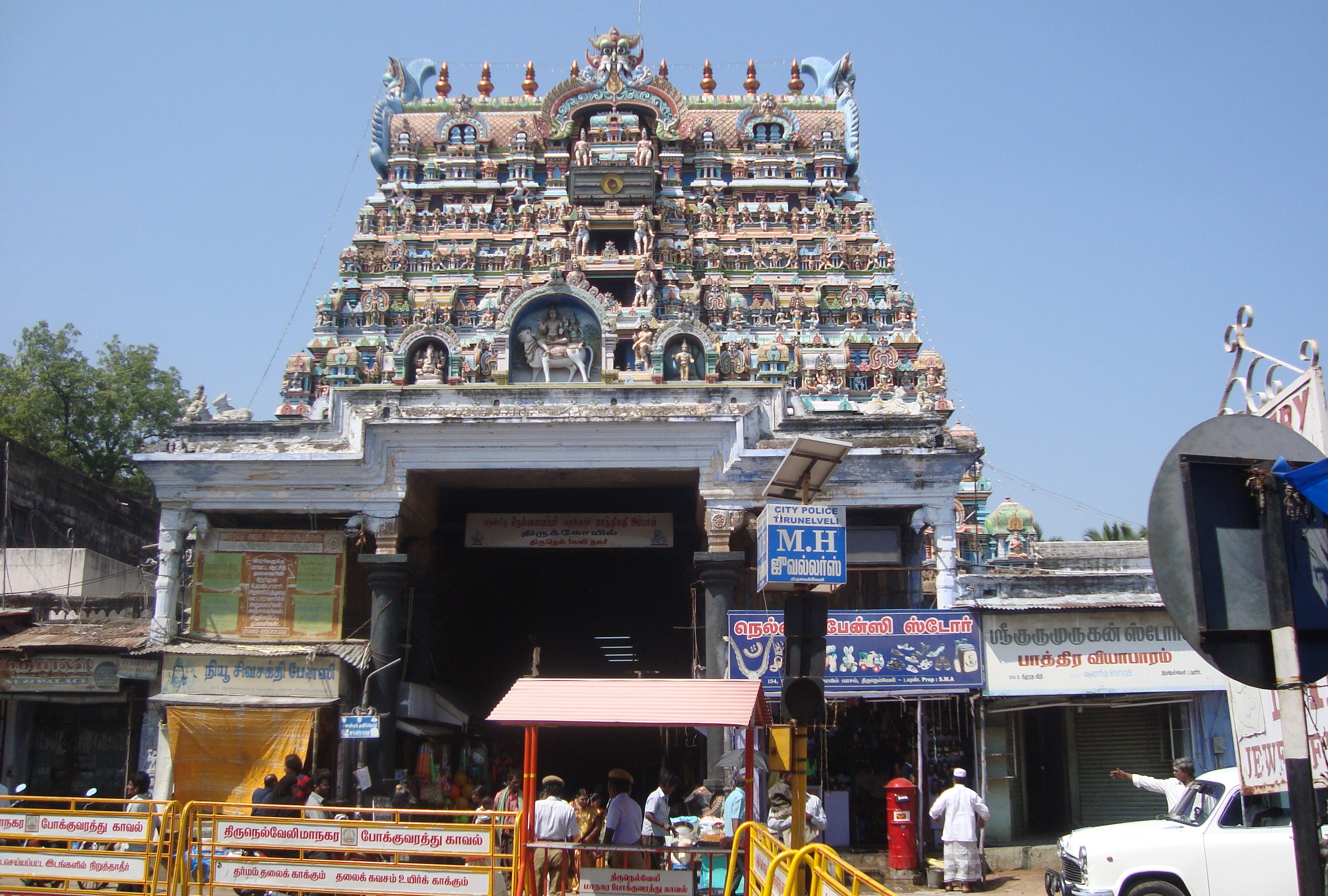
Swamy Nellaiappar temple at Tirunelveli town in Tirunelveli City

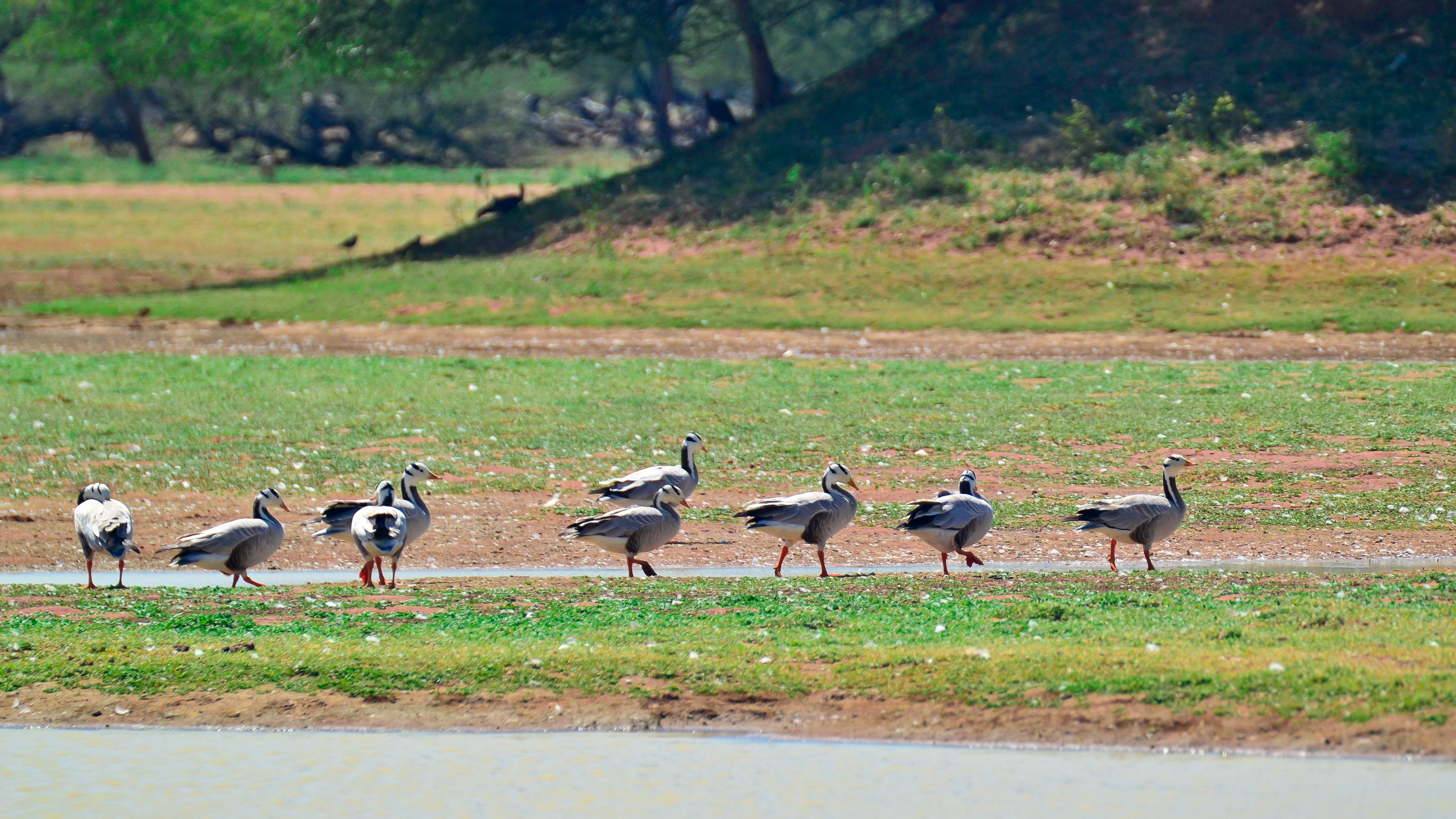
Koodankulam Bird Sanctuary

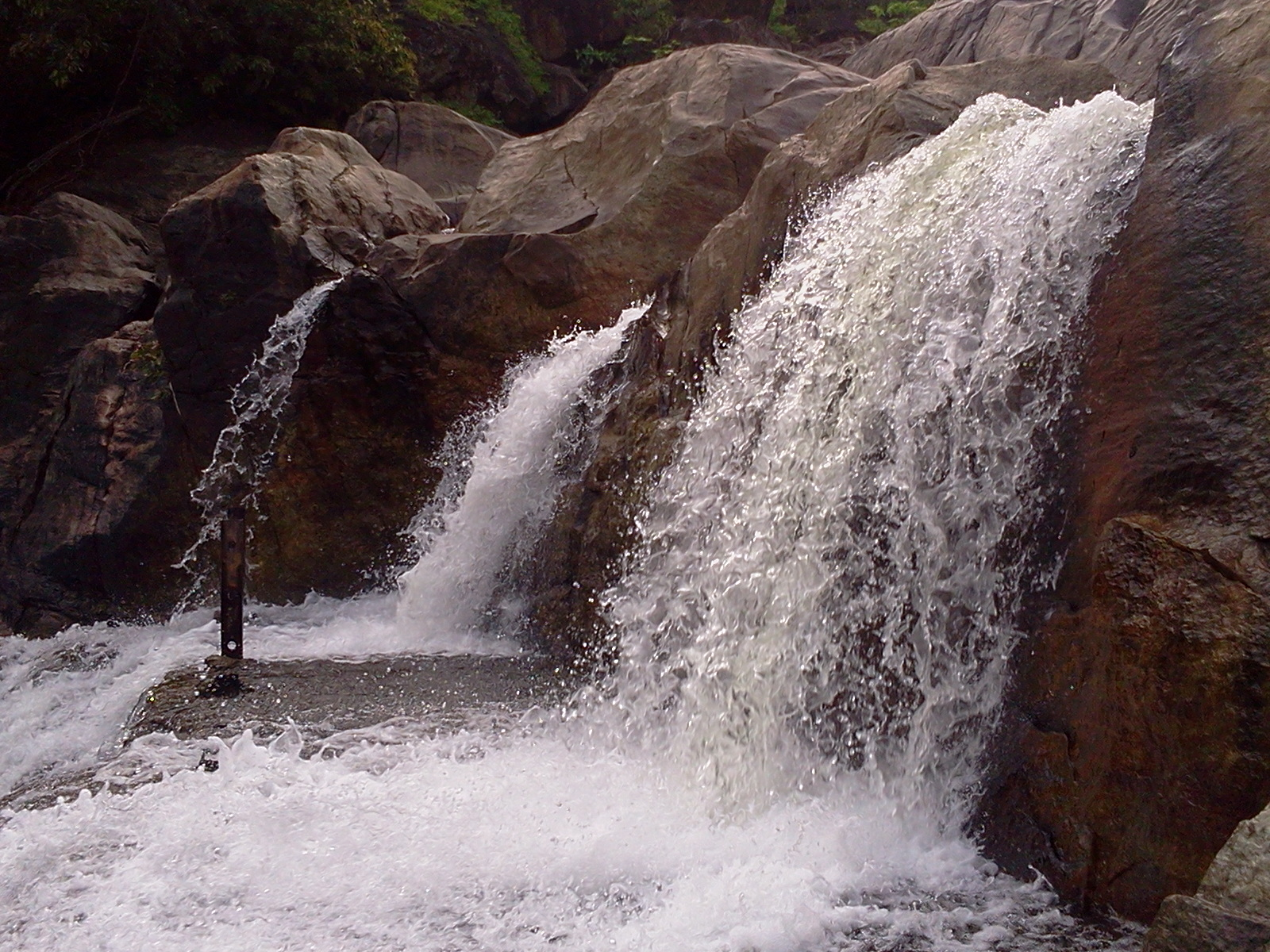
Manimuthar falls

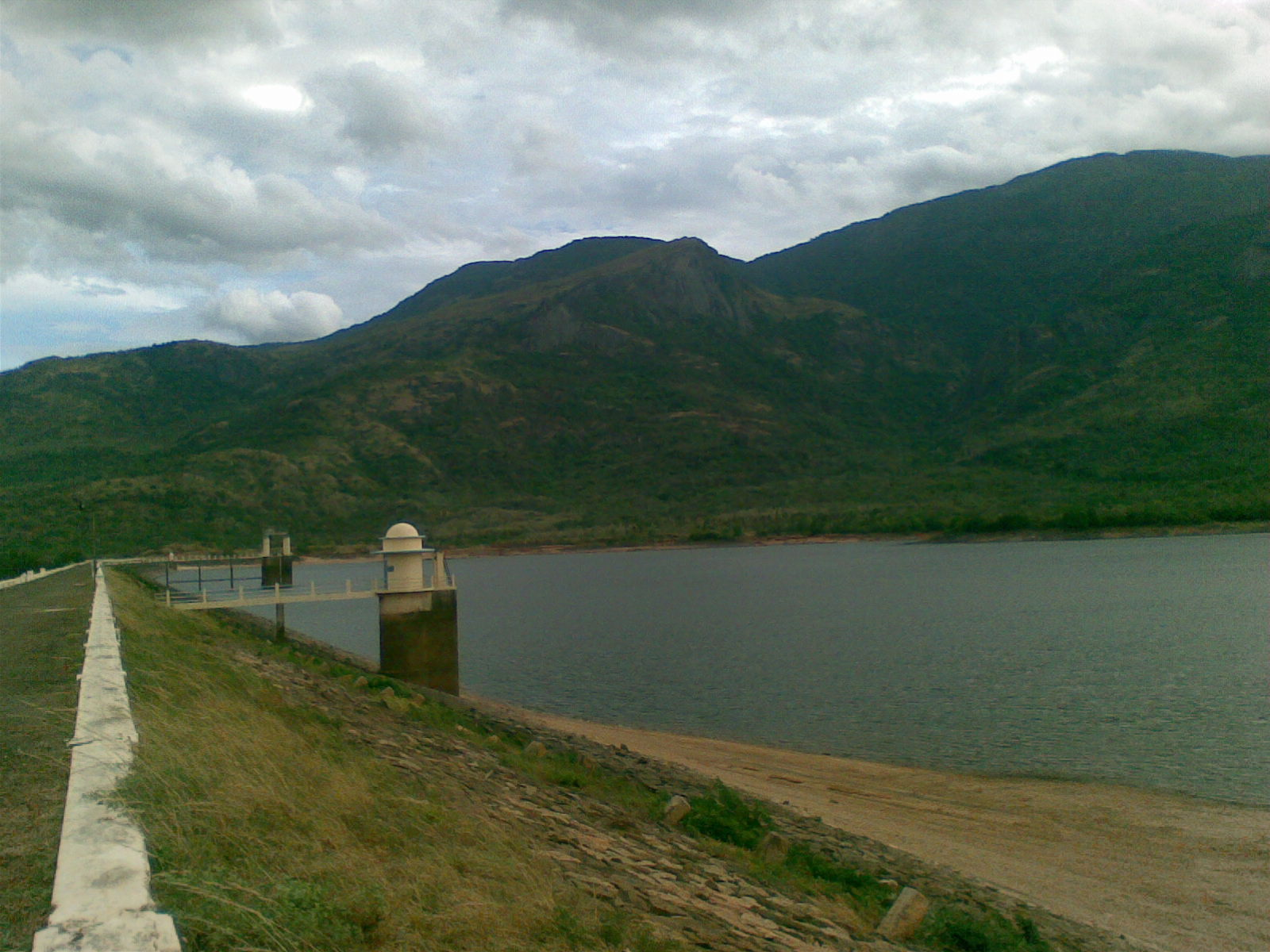
Gadananathi River or Karunai River Dam

== See also ==
- List of districts of Tamil Nadu
- Athankarai Dargah
