= List of zamindari estates in the Madras Presidency =

Zamindaris were established in the Madras Presidency by the government of the British East India Company starting from 1799 onwards. These settlements were established in order to delineate authority to landlords and thereby relieve the ryot from the control of middlemen who often exploited them. Often, these zamindars were Indian Native princes who lost their sovereignty due to British expansion. The zamindari settlement was based on a similar settlement established in Bengal. The Zamindari settlement of Madras was largely unsuccessful and was wrapped up in 1852. However, a few Zamindaris remained till India's independence in 1947.

== Land proprietorship in Madras Presidency ==
The colonial Madras Presidency comprised an area of 148,796 square miles (385,380 km^{2}), of which 141,705 square miles (367,010 km^{2}) were under direct British rule, while the rest was distributed amongst the princely states. In the areas administered by the British, three systems of land proprietorship existed: zamindaris, inams and ryotwaris.

In 1911, zamindari estates covered 26 million acres (110,000 km^{2}) and occupied over one-fourth of the total area of the presidency. In 1945-46, there were 20,945,456 acres (84,763.25 km^{2}) of Zamindari estates which yielded a revenue of 97,83,167 Rupees and 58,904,798 acres (238,379.26 km^{2}) of ryotwari lands which yielded a revenue of Rs. 7,26,65,330.

== Zamindaris from 1799 to 1852 ==
The zamindari system was introduced in the Madras Presidency in 1799 in the aftermath of the defeat of the Polygars in the Polygar Wars.

== Zamindaris in 1877-1920 ==
In 1877, C. D.Maclean made a survey of the existing zamindaris under the jurisdiction of Madras Presidency. As per this survey, a few of these zamindaris were larger than some of the smaller princely states in the Presidency. The largest of these were Jeypore Estate which was the largest amongst all zamindaris in the Presidency with an area of 12,000 square miles (31,000 km^{2}), Vizianagaram with 2,970 square miles (7,700 km^{2}), Ramnad, Ganapur and Sivaganga, Ramnad and Sivaganga being demoted princely states, were larger in size than the princely states of Cochin or Pudukkottai. Ramnad, the larger of the two, covered an area of 2,351 square miles (6,090 km^{2}), and was second only to Travancore amongst princely states in Madras Presidency. Karvatinuggur, Kalahasti, Nuzvid, Poonganur, Paralekhemidi and Podile and Darsi divisions of Venkatagiri were larger in size than the princely state of Banganapalle while Virasanapettah, Arni estate and Kanguni were larger than Sandur.

List of zamindaris in Madras Presidency in the year 1877
Zamindari	Area (in square miles)	Population in 1877	Revenue paid to the Madras government in 1877 (in rupees)
Chengalpattu district
Kayapakkam	2	670	
Ellimbedu			1,066
Nemmili			848
Karamthangal			148
Bunanthangal			152
Keevaloor			530
Belayanoor			159
Palanallore			455
Thathanur			118
Bhimapuram			102
Vayaloor			1,085
Periveli			458
Magayur			1,752
Isoor			658
Irumbedu			239
Amayampattu			28
Vichoor			123
Vilangansor			132
Perla Velikadu			146
Vettur			320
Saravabakam			225
Othevilakam			235
Karimbakam			210
Vembanur			321
Panayur			244
Vilangadu			297
Puthukuppam			46
Keelakandai			177
Sinna Velikadu			193
Nungambakkam			544
Venmalagram			102
Sirulakatoor			44
Pondur			3,693
Torayur			147
Sirumayllor			446
Andarkuppam			363
Chithur			165
Thundan Vellery			117
Mambakam			205
Kalputtu			121
Agarum			565
Coimbatore district
Oothocooly			4,393
Samattur and Kottampatty			1683, 1860, 4200
Avalappampatty			2804
Poravipolliem			1436
Negamam			2480
Metrathy			1966
Thoongary			848
Myvady			561
Jothampatty			146
Vedapatty			146
Andipatty			5,166
Mooloor and Okinium			2,236
Sattiagalam			....
Ganjam district
Akkayavalasa	1	788	278
Asika	3.56	7,712	4,857
Athgarh	149.37	77,228	60,000
Baruva	10.25	8,454	7,800
Beddam	1.75	217	89
Belamarapalavalasa	2.33	855	
Beridi	14.75	10,960	4,500
Budharsinghi	4.25	3,244	500
Chackipalli	0.75	1,018	869
Chikiti	64.5	40,789	34,000
Chinnakemidi (Sana Khemundi)	55.31	29,849	20,000
Chinnatangam	7.43	395	424
Chittivalasa	1	5,698	2,074
Danta	4.06	3,220	3,309
Dharakot (Dharakote)	50.25	31,262	25,000
Davabhumi	4	3,539	5,188
Gopalpur	1,171	5,165	3,699
Jalantar	25.5	18,450	7,000
Jarada	9	5,813	1,002
Jarangi	2.75	2,336	1,002
Jonnupada	0.31	138	93
Khallikot	84	42,589	19,000
Karakavalasa	9.06	7,795	4,048
Konsalacuttur	0.33	574	393
Kurla	3.75	5,457	5,455
Lusaram	0.75	320	332
Malgam	1.56	916	572
Mandasa	35.75	34,508	14,000
Mungatavalasa	5.75	3,695	4,048
Palur	16.31	4,173	553
Paralekhemedi	451.5	252,391	82,139
Pedda Khimedi (Bada Khemundi)	78.43	40,810	23,500
Peddatangam	0.31	564	424
Rajapur	0.18	266	76
Santalaksimipur	7.06	485	1,192
Seddibeharakuttur	0.25	109	103
Seerghar (Sheragada)	20.75	9,595	5,500
Srikurmana (part of Vizianagaram)	17.75	16,927	Included in Vizianagaram
Sorada	46	15,324	4,000
Surangi	14.75	12,919	3,500
Talasamudram	1.37	923	2,383
Takkali Estates	61.56	58,054	49,088
Tallavalasa	0.37	387	424
Tarla	28.75	24,639	4,000
Tarlepatta	0.75	388	256
Tilaru	15.75	6,180	3,654
Towdam	2.5	1,030	686
Urlam	14.5	11,061	13,582
Yellamanchilli	1	643	654
Godavary district
Pittapore	188	79,606	3,41,627
Polavaram	292	58,274	43,210
Kolanka			14350
Tuni	376	50,201	26429
Dommeru	240	35,001	
Annavarapu Peta			3895
Kapileswara Puram			8765
Undrajavaram			630
Kotipally			Peskash in the Vizianagaram Zamindari
Uppada and Aminbada			673
Nidadavolu and Barhajhally			1,19,346
Ambarapet			16,097
Vegayammapeta			8362
Tangellmudi			5143
Bhimolu			3031
Anumullanka			611
Singanagudem			46
Vilasa			1440
Janupalle			218
Jalimudi			277
Telikicherla			962
Gundepalli			962
Panangipalli			737
Sirasavilli Savaram			300
Bantumilli			200
Mukkamala			107
Jaggampet			33,072
Dontamuru			3248
Rayavaram			1998
Viravaram			26876
Palivela			19,240
Kirlampudi			23,382
Gopalapuram			18,540
Elamanchili			8,823
Chinchinada			1647
China Mamidipalli			255
Neredumilli			445
Vardhanani			532
Dhumantigudem			142
Gollaprolu			11,567
Kesanakuru			11,574
Vasantavada			7,349
Narayanapuram			2,948
Malakacherla			1,495
Daddipudi			378
Gutala			6,749
Mungondapalem			545
Chidipi			1,671
Peddeham			2,628
Tirugudumetta			1,856
Injeram			3,217
Pattesam			2,282
Prakkilanka			1,822
Vangalapudi			3,817
Viravillipalem			3,534
Nadavapalli			3,129
Tyajampudi			2,791
Kurukuru			1,482
Billumilli			1,619
Lakkavaram			2,643
Jangareddigudem			499
Dharmavaram			2402
Krapa			2,385
Malakapalli			2,282
Katavaram			2,135
Yadavolu			2,161
Konitivada			2,004
Borrampalem			1,038
Vegavaram			787
Gavuripatnam			1,853
Murumanda			1,850
Anatavaram			1,763
Magam			1,746
Yernagudem			1,725
Vunkaramilli alias Ravimetta			1,630
Kalavalapalli			1346
Pativala Gurajanapalli			1,296
Mallavaram			947
Johurullabada alias Hukumpeta			1,401
Buchampeta			738
Gangolu			1,264
Vella			1,240
Bayyanagudem			1,006
Potukurru			210
Bommuru			853
Guttinadeevi			776
Kondagudem			753
Petta			583
Viravaram			554
Dandangi			551
Surasaniyanam			529
Nilapalli			479
Nandigudem			390
Nallamillipadu			203
Gavaravaram			145
jagannadhapuram			117
Pydimetta			110
Vadlapattanam			86
Tirumanagudem			64
Mansubdari of Godavari district
Thotapalle Estate			6,310
Bhadrachalam and Rakapalli	505	27,695	21,090
Bollineni			.....
Kistna district
Nuzvid Estate	561	107,465	1,08,221
Virsanapettah	257	55,662	20,829
Challapalli			
Chintalapati Vantu			17,500
Chevendra			4,776
Chanubanda			1.357
Mylavaram Muttah 1.25 vantu			4,858
Mylavaram Muttah 1 vantu			3,887
Vutukur Muttah			2,156
Half of Tiruvur Muttah			2,117
Yenagadapa Muttah			1,236
Half og Gumpalagudem Muttah			1,295
Western part of Gumpalagudem muttah			1,291
Munagala Paragana			4,572
Vallur South			20,493
Gudur Paragana			35,988
Pinagudur Lanka			319
Kruttiventi South			2,910
Balliparru			459
Kuchipudy			229
Narayanagudem			138
Other Half of Tiruur muttah			2219
Kalagara			812
Putrela			510
Kondur and Kmbhampad			507
Kokilampad			75
Pengollu			1,262
Munukulla			71
Komera Muttah			703
Lingagiri Pragana			486
Devarapally			451
Rayavaram			908
China Gollapalem			238
Chitti Gudur			524
Madura district
Ammayanayakkanur	100		11,606
Ramnad	2,351	504,131	3,38,686
Sivaganga	1,557	434,253	2,88,317
Paliembatti			13,544
Pandalgudi			11,136
Rettiembadi			11,978
Velur			10,563
Velliagundam Taluk			2,183
Sirupaly			903
Puliengolum			1,931
Jotilanaikanoor			1,070
Woodapanaiknoor			2,583
Thoddappanaiknoor			2,179
Keelacottai			480
Nadukottai			773
Melaycottai			910
Perayoor			11,857
Sappattor			8,813
Santhayoor			3,697
Yeloomalai			3,612
Bodinaiknoor			15,347
Gantamanaiknoor			13,414
Tevaram			1,100
Yerasackanaiknoor			2,061
Kannivady			38,120
Ayagudy			16,785
Yedayacottai			7,000
Mambaray			1,500
Nellore district
Venkatagiri			3,77,085
Darsi division	488	73,139	Revenue included under Venkatagiri
Podile division	405	62,934	Revenue included under Venkatagiri
Chundi			21,219
Mutyalpad			2,000
North Arcot district
Arni Jagir(e)	170	77,679	5,933
Kalahasti	602	135,104	1,76,816
Kangundi	179	52,047	22,959
Karvetinagar	634	289,894	1,80,495
Punganur Estate	524	109,282	66,859
Pulicherla Polliem			5,580
Bungari Polliem			11,643
Gudipati			2,849
Thummba Polliem			1,783
Kallur Polliem			4,097
Naraganti Polliem			6,553
Karakambodi Polliem			.....
Krishnapuram Polliem			...
Tanjore district
Poraiyar Nadar's estate			
Kabisthalam estate			
Kadalangudi estate			
Kunniyur estate	> 24		
Poondi estate	> 24		
Ukkadai estate	> 24		
Koonampatti			
Vadapadimangalam estate	> 24		
Gandharvakottai estate			6,577
Sillathur			2,165
Palayavanam			3,767
Singavanam			3,261
Mudukkur			2,461
Nedvasal			2,067
Sandangudi			2,046
Kallakottai			1,701
Padaramkottai			1,309
Attivette			913
Konur			433
Punavasal			350
Tirunelveli district
Alagapuri	5.2	2,452	
Avudyapuram	13.36	6,960	
Ettaiyapuram	527.47	140,108	
Kollapatti	20.4	7,530	
Jennalkudi	11.34	3,532	
Kadambur	25.8	7,590	
Kollakondan	1.35	9,021	
Kulattur	15.27	4,903	
Mannarkottai	21.16	13,900	
Maniachi	15	3,190	
Melmandai	34.1	4,460	
pithapuram	101.48	14,034	56789
Setthur	91.44	11,916	
Singampatti	110.38	16,295	
Sivagiri	122.38	49,531	
Surandei	1.34	2,580	
Sivagalai	14.37		
Talavankottai	6.14	3,117	
Thenkalam			....
Uurkad	3.32	3,903	
Uthumalai	124.49	31,541	
Trichinopoly district
Udayarpalayam			642
Thoriyur			700
Marungapuri			20,586
Kadavur			13,410
Kattuputtoor			15,901
Ariyalur			700
Vizagapatam district
Anakapalli	597	143,549	-
Bimlipatam	243	113,079	-
Bobbili Estate	333	140,739	-
Chepudipalli	615	162,827	-
Gajapatinagarum	276	121,758	-
Golaconda	874	26,720	1,02,374
Hill tracts of Golconda and Viravalli	500	15,880	-
Jeypore Estate	12000	405700	N. A.
Kurupam	800	80,034	2,50,000
Salur	222	77,006	-
Vavilavalasa and Siripuram	440.30	33,006	-
Sarvasiddi	960	129,185	1,90,595
Serungavarapukota	318	130,362	-
Viravalli	688	166,184	-
Visakhapatnam	216	90,467	-
Gubbi Samasthanam	94684	236,789	10,93,567
Vizianagaram	2,970	149,920	-
Source:MaClean, C. D. (1877). Standing Information regarding the Official Administration of Madras Presidency. Government of Madras. pp. 419–434.

== Other zamindaris ==
This is a list of other zamindaris which were either not included in MaClean's list or were non-existent at the time of the enumeration.

Zamindari	District
Ammayanayakannur	
Anegundi Raj	
Amudala Kalva Estate	
Bodinaickanur	
Chinna Merangi	
Panyam estate	
Manchuru Estate	
Nungambakkam Estate	Chengalpattu
Gannavaram	East Godavari
Dharmavaram Estate	West Godavari
Ramakrishnarajuvari Peta	
Thotapalle Mansabdari	East Godavari
Rekapalle Estate	East Godavari
Kalavalapalli	West Godavari
Nandigama, Jaggampeta, Part thereof Annadevarapeta

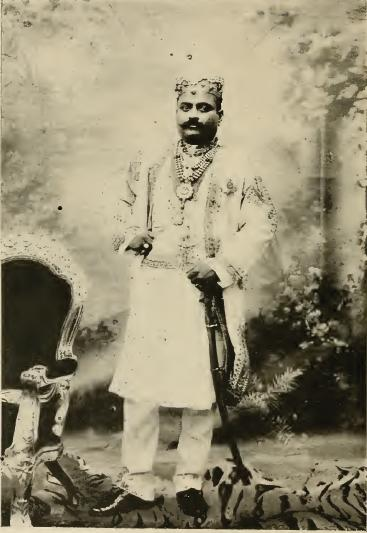
His Highness Maharaja Sir Raja Sri Ravu Svetachalapati Venkatesh Srinivasa Ranga Rao Bahadur of Gubbi (1881-1921)

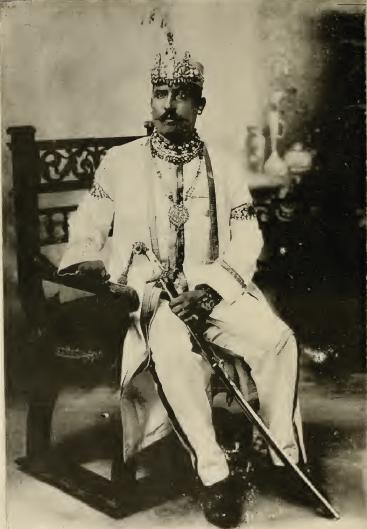
His Highness Maharaja Sir Vikram Dev III Bahadur of Jeypore

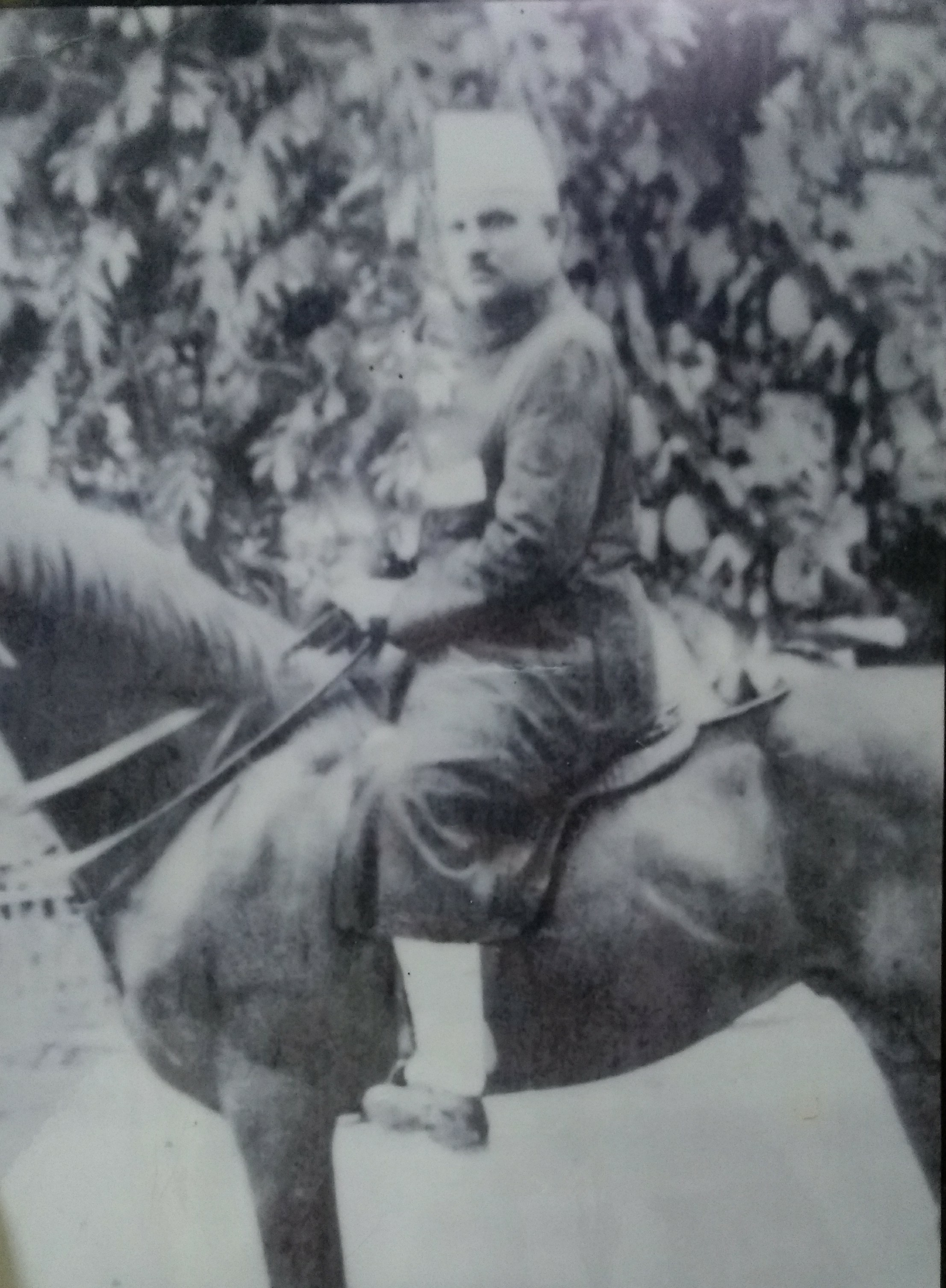
HH Raja P. V. Bheemasena Rao of Panyam, Andhra Pradesh

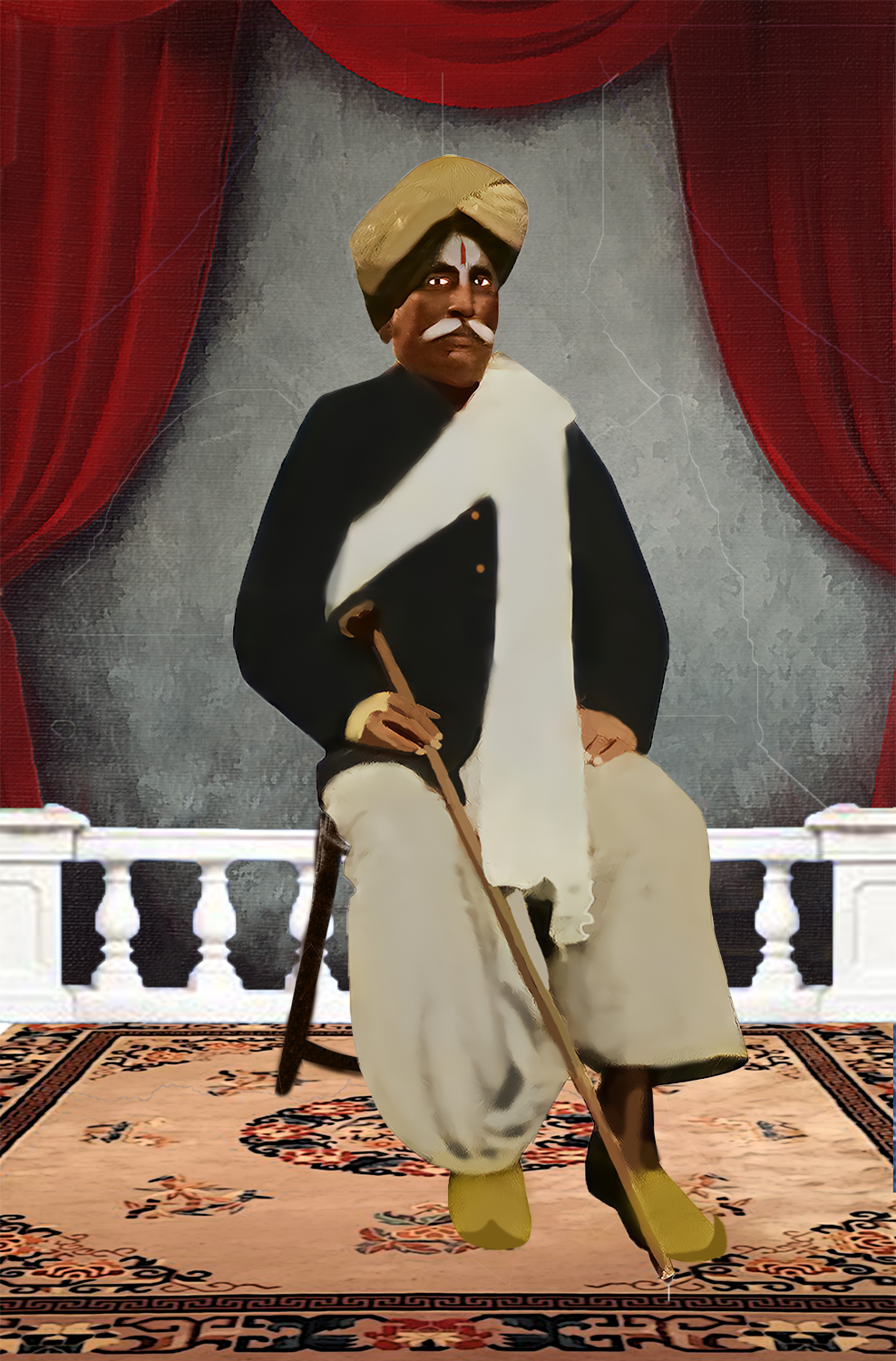
Raja Vogeti Ramakrishnayya of Rajahmundry, Andhra Pradesh

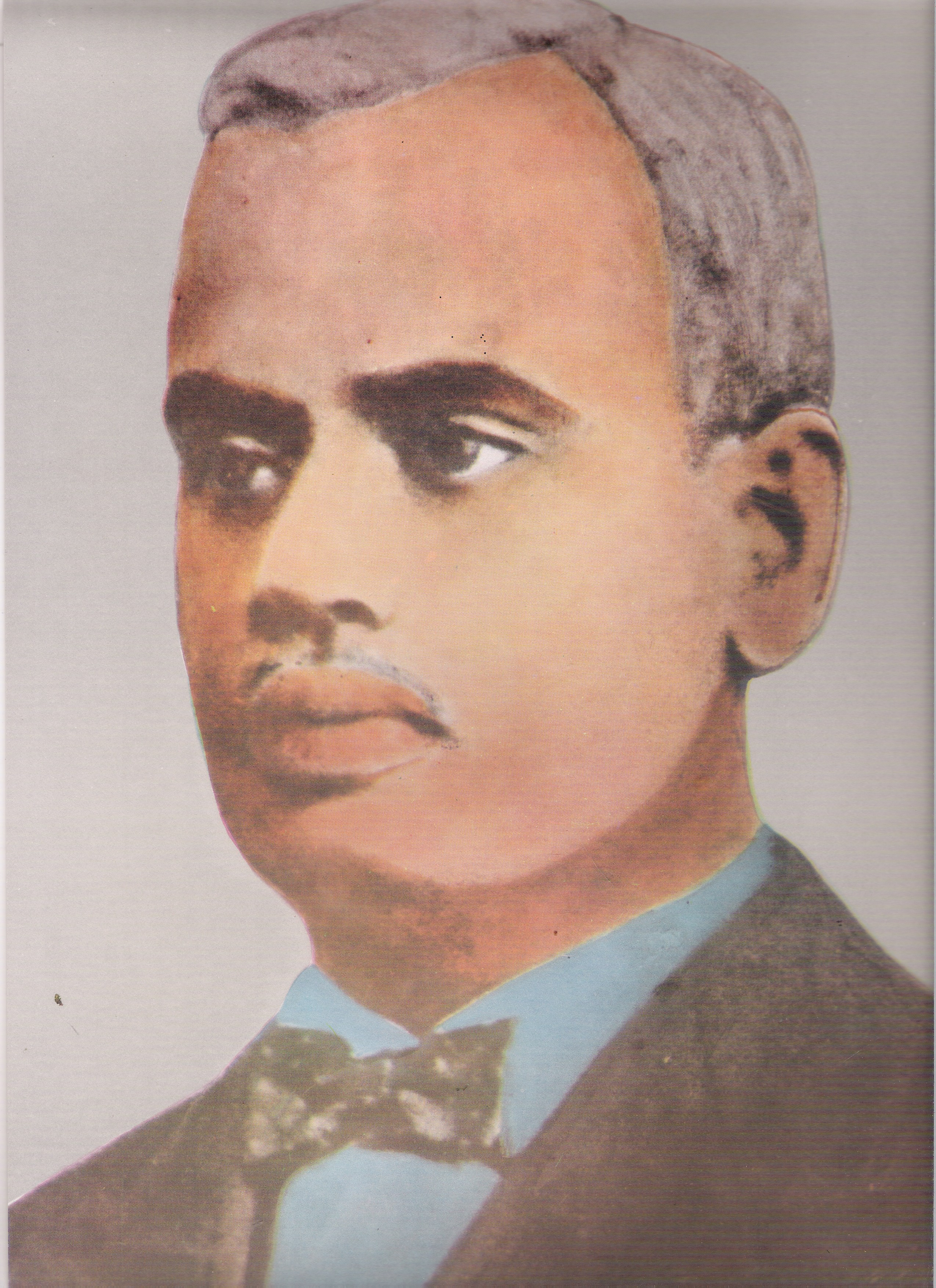
Portrait of Rao Venkata Kumara Maheepati SuryaRao

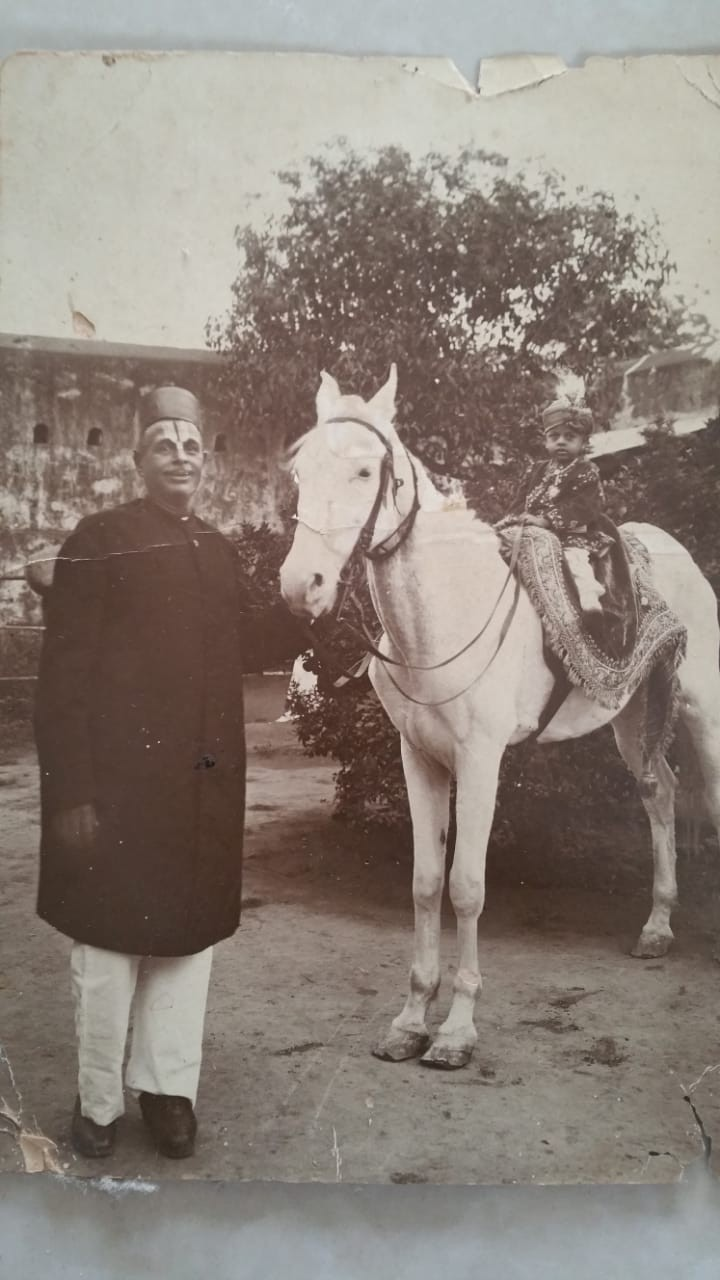
Raja Rangayya Apparao Zamindar of Kapileswarapuram

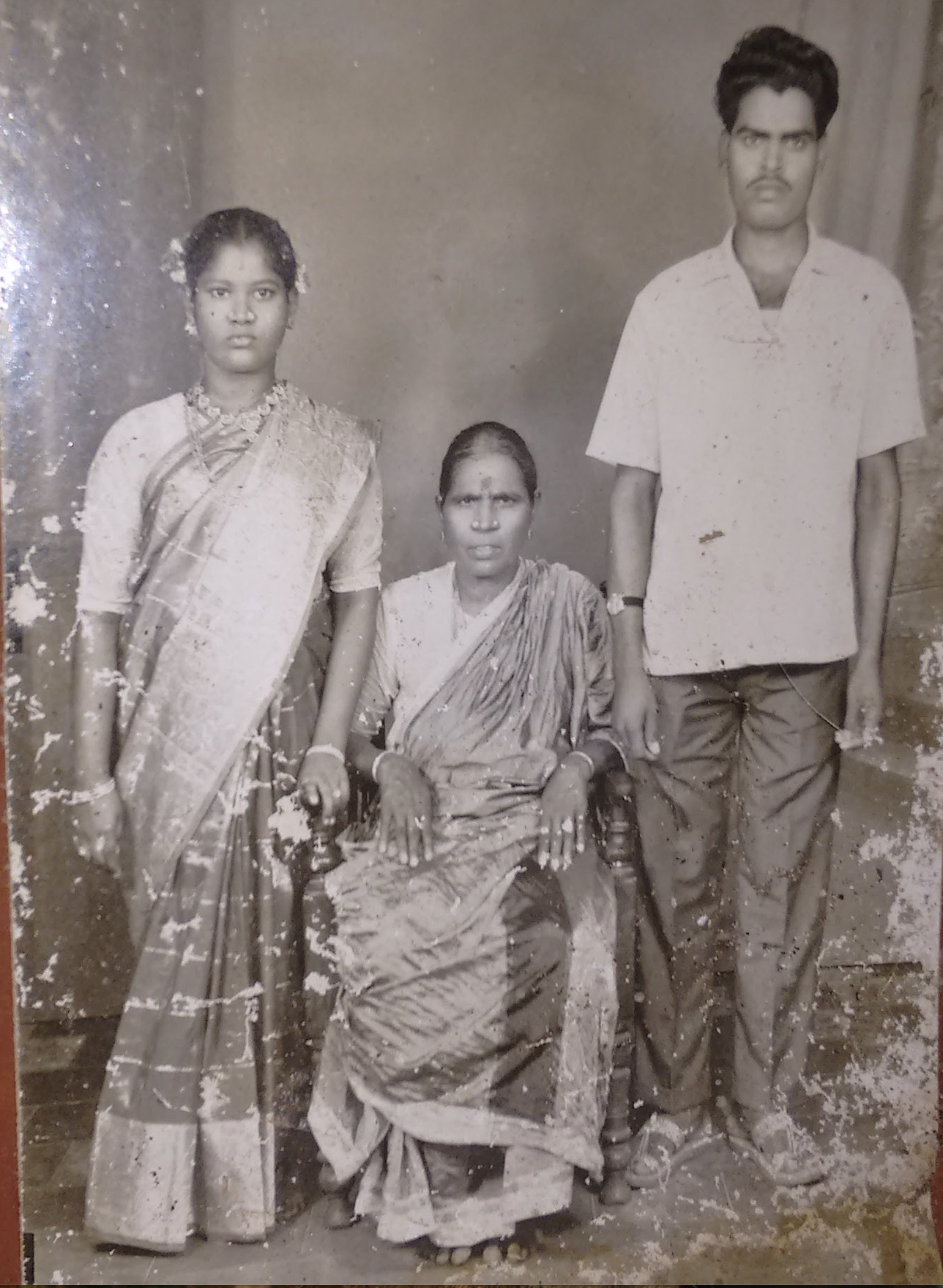
Rani Muniamma pillai (center) of Nungambakkam

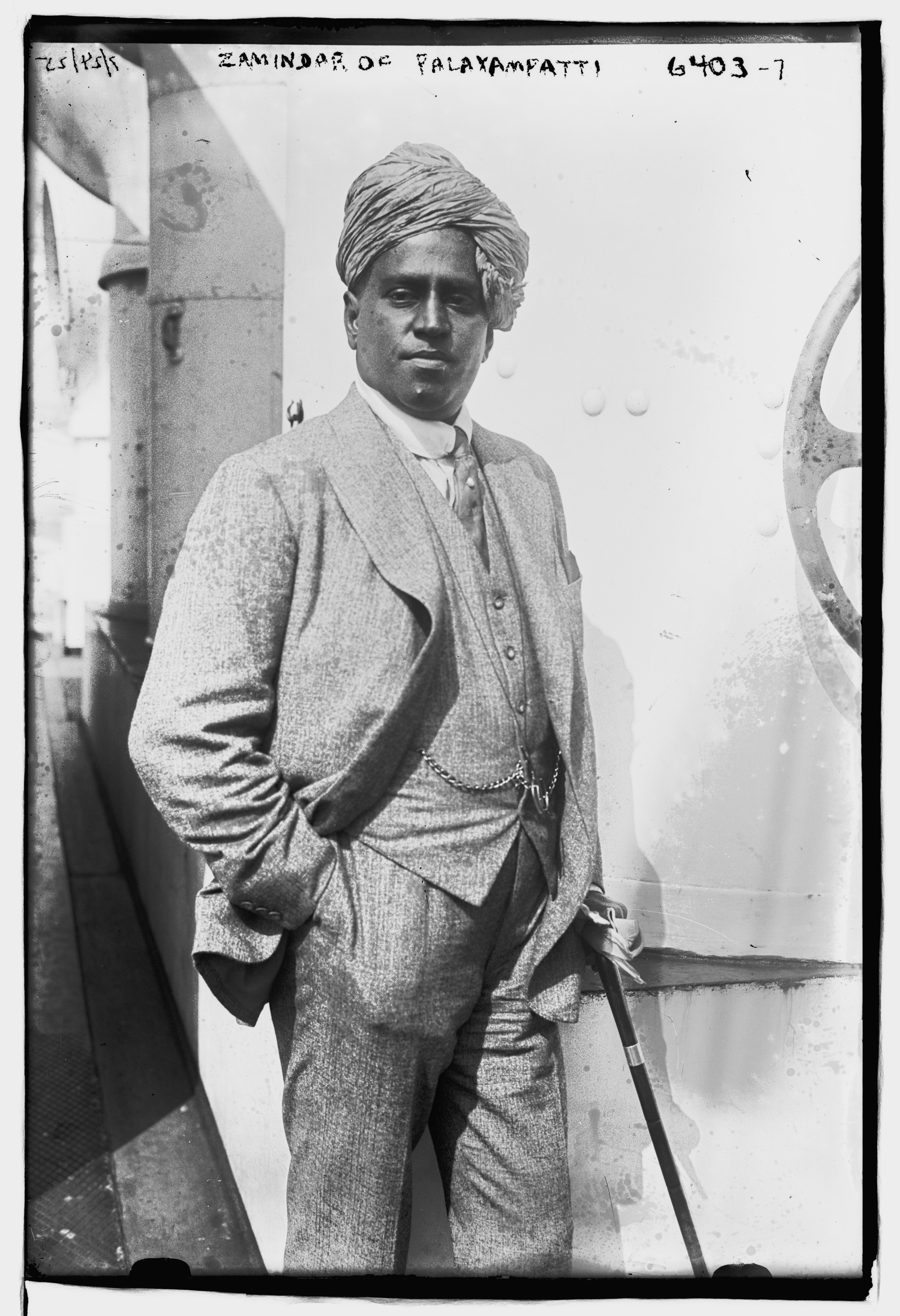
Sri Ramachandra Thevar, Zamindar of Palyamkottai

== See also ==
- List of Zaildars by Zail
- Indian feudalism
- Indian honorifics
- Maratha titles
- Jagirdar
- Mankari
- Lambardar
- Patwari
- Sarpanch
- Zamindar
- Princely state
- Zamindars of Bihar
- Zamindars of Bengal
