= Podakkudi =

Podakkudi Piraikodi
- Nickname: PDK
- Interactive map of Podakkudi
- Country: India
- State: Tamil Nadu
- District: Thiruvarur

Area
  - Total: 2 km^{2} (0.77 sq mi)

Languages
  - Official: Tamil
- Time zone: UTC+5:30 (IST)
- PIN: 614103
- Telephone code: 04367
- Vehicle registration: TN-50 (Thiruvarur)
- Nearest metro city: Tiruchirappalli
- Literacy: 50%
- Lok Sabha constituency: Thanjavur
- State Legislative Assembly constituency: Mannargudi
- Website: www.podakkudi.info

Podakkudi (Shortened as PDK) is a village in Thiruvarur district in the South Indian state of Tamil Nadu. The town is located at a distance of 20 km (12 mi) from the district headquarters Thiruvarur and 272 km (169 mi) from the state capital Chennai. Podakkudi is known for the Big Pallivasal, a prominent Islamic shrine. Nearby town is Koothanallur and the nearby villages are Atthikadai and Budamangalam.

Podakkudi is derived from Pirai Kodi (Crescent Flag). Crescent flag were used as the identity of Muslims, the village was known by this name and over time it has become Podakkudi. Podakkudi was a part of Tanjore district until India's independence in 1947 and Nagapattinam district until 1991 and subsequently a part of the newly formed Thiruvarur district. The town is a part of the fertile Cauvery Delta and the major profession in the town is agriculture.

Podakkudi is administered by a village Gram panchayat. Podakkudi comes under the Mannargudi assembly constituency which elects a member to the Tamil Nadu Legislative Assembly once every five years and it is a part of the Thanjavur constituency which elects its Member of Parliament (MP) once in five years. Roadways are the major mode of transportation to the town and the nearest railway station is at Mannargudi and Koradacheri. The nearest seaport is Nagapattinam Port, located 33 km (21 mi) away, while the nearest airport is the Tiruchirappalli International Airport, located 104 km (65 mi) away from the town.

== Geography and climate ==
Podakkudi is located at 10.736667°N 79.500556°E. Rivers Vennar and Vettar, which flows on the two edges of the village, keeps the soil fertile. The topography is completely flat and the town is a part of the fertile Cauvery Delta. Podakkudi is situated at a distance of 350 km (220 mi) from the state capital Chennai and 33 km (21 mi) from Tiruvarur, the district headquarters. The type of soil is predominantly clay and sandy, conducive for cultivation. There are no commercial mineral resources in the town. Like in the rest of the state, the period from November to February in Mannargudi has a climate full of warm days and cool nights. The onset of summer is from March to the end of June. The average temperature range from 37 °C (99 °F) in January to 22.5 °C (72.5 °F) in May and June. Summer rains are sparse and the first monsoon, the South-West monsoon, usually sets in June and continues until September. North-East monsoon usually sets in October and continues until January. The rainfall during North-East monsoon is relatively higher and is beneficial to the district at large because of the heavy rainfall and the Western ghats feeding the river Cauvery. The average rainfall is 1,146.8 mm (45.15 in), most of which is contributed by the North-East monsoon.

== Culture ==
=== Legends and rituals ===
The muslims of podakudi are Rowthers. Rowthers are traditionally Horsemen, Wealthy Landlords and traders. they follows Hanafi fiqh. Aqidah of the podakkudi is based on Sunnah heavily influenced by the peaceful teachings of Islam. Podakkudi families are patrilocal and the nikkah (marriage) registers mahr and witness. As a mark of modesty Rowthers women usually wear white thuppatti (whilst travelling only) which is draped over their whole body on top of the Saree.
