= Vadapadimangalam estate =

Vadapadimangalam estate was a mirasdari estate in the Tiruvarur district of Tamil Nadu, India. It was owned by a Mudaliar family of the Thondaimandala Vellalar caste. The estate originated as a grant of land to the family who operated as Pattakdars or revenue collectors on behalf of the Thanjavur Maratha ruler Thuljaji.

Vadapadimangalam estate covered a total area of 8,004 acres in 1951 and was one of the largest estates in the erstwhile Tanjore district of Madras Presidency, British India alongside Poondi, Ukkadai and Kunniyur.
