= Vandayar =

Vandayar is a surname of royal descent. The "Vandayar" is a subcaste within the larger Kallar caste, which is part of the Mukkulathor(Thevar) community in Tamil Nadu, India.

Notable people with the surname include:

- K. Thulasiah Vandayar (1929–2021), Indian politician
- Rao Bahadur V. Appasamy Vandayar, Indian politician
