= Nahangudi =

Nahangudi is a village located near Koothanallur, Tiruvarur District, in the state of Tamil Nadu, India. An estimated 100 families reside in the settlement. The majority of people living in the settlement are engaged in agriculture based occupations.

== Transportation ==
Nahangudi is located between Koothanallur and Vadapathimangalam. People can reach Nahangudi by buses operated by Tamil Nadu State Transport Corporation.
The closest to the town is Tiruchirappalli, which is 100 km away.
The closest railway stations are Mannargudi railway station and Thiruvarur Junction railway station which are 15 km away.

== Education ==
There are two schools:

1. Alavudeen Aided Primary School
2. Dr. Al Ameen A.R. Matriculation School
