= Tanjore District (Madras Presidency) =

District of British India

- District of the Madras Presidency
- 1799–1950
- Flag

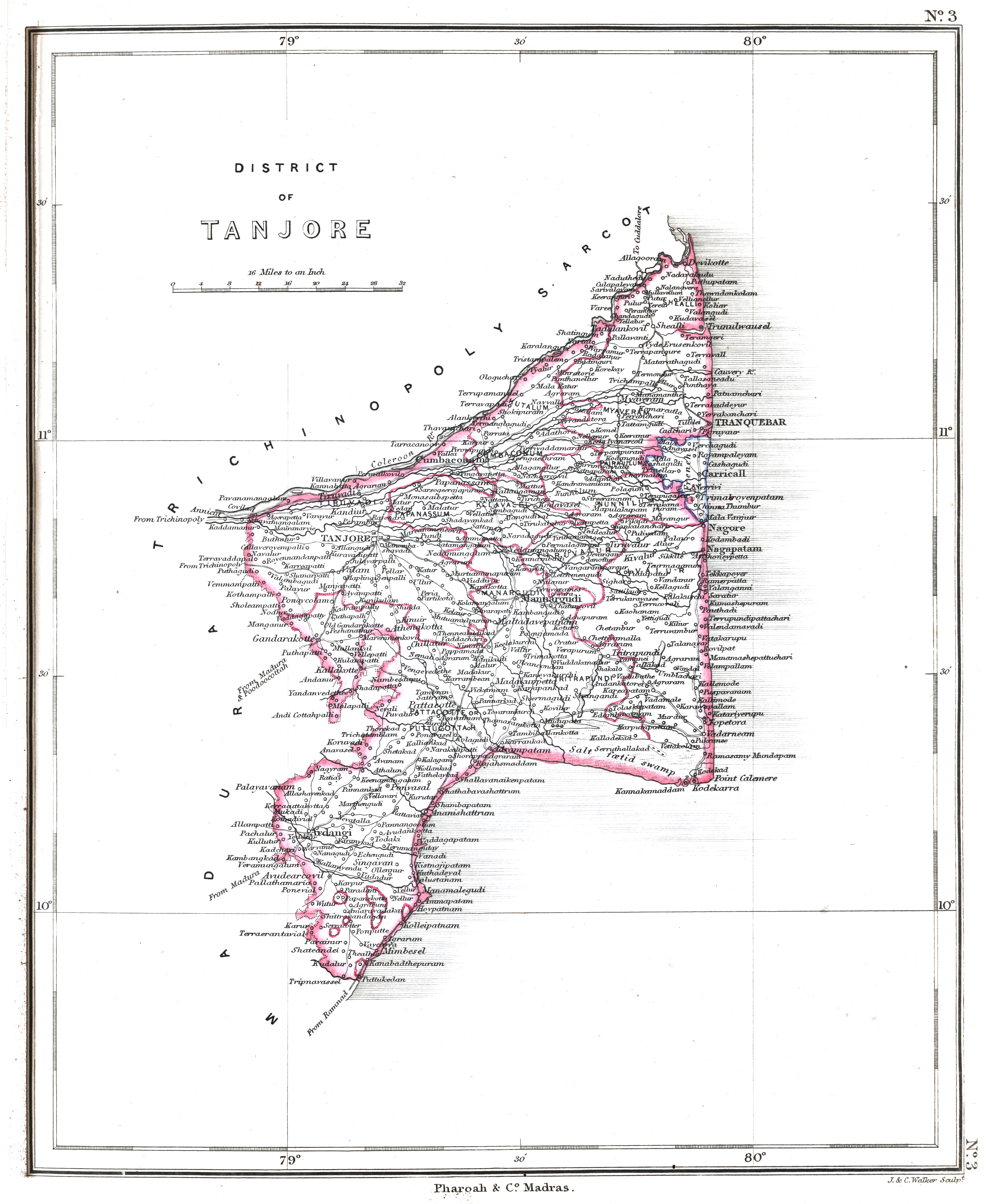
- Tanjore District 1854
- Capital: Nagapattinam (1799–1845); Tarangambadi (1845–1860); Thanjavur (1860–1950)
- Demonym: Tanjorean
- History
  - Establishment of the district: 1799
  - Modern Thanjavur District: 1950
Preceded by	Succeeded by
Thanjavur Maratha kingdom	Thanjavur District

Tanjore District was one of the districts in the erstwhile Madras Presidency of British India. It covered the area of the present-day districts of Thanjavur, Tiruvarur, Nagapattinam, Mayiladuthurai and Aranthangi taluk, Karambakkudi taluk of Pudukkottai District in Tamil Nadu. Apart from being a bedrock of Hindu orthodoxy, Tanjore was a centre of Chola cultural heritage and one of the richest and most prosperous districts in Madras Presidency.

Tanjore district was constituted in 1799 when the Thanjavur Maratha ruler Serfoji II ceded most of his kingdom to the British East India Company in return for his restitution on the throne. Tanjore district, which is situated on the Cauvery Delta, is one of the richest rice-growing regions in South India. It was scarcely affected by famines such as the Great Famine of 1876–78.

== Geography ==
The Tanjore District was bounded by the districts of South Arcot in the north, Trichinopoly to the west and south-west, and the Pudukkottai and Ramnad States, later Madura district, to the south. The Kollidam River formed the long northern boundary with South Arcot. The Bay of Bengal bounded it on the east.

The district was made of four well-marked physical tracts - the fertile plains to the north between the Kollidam and the Kaveri known as the "Old Delta" which was naturally irrigated by the rivers through a system of anaicuts and comprising the whole of the taluks of Shiyali (Sirkazhi), Mayavaram (Mayiladuthurai). and Kumbakonam, the northern part of Mannargudi and Nannilam and the eastern part of Tanjore taluk; the plains to the south of the Kaveri river covering the southern part of Nannilam and Mannargudi taluks known as the "New Delta" for the reason that these tracts were only recently brought under irrigation by numerous manmade canals from the Kaveri and Kollidam and its tributaries and which were less fertile than the Old Delta; the arid Vallam plateau which covered the western part of Tanjore and Pattukkottai taluks and the Vedaranyam salt pans the largest of its kind in the Madras Presidency that extended for about thirty miles in length and four or five miles in width from Point Calimere to Adiramapatnam covering the southern portion of Thiruthiraipoondi taluk and eastern half of Pattukkottai taluk. There were two inhabited islands situated within the confines of the district - those of Devicottah situated at the mouth of the Kollidam and Vinayagateru near Kumbakonam.

Most of the landholdings in Tanjore District were inam or mirasdari land, the district had the largest proportion of land under mirasdars. There were few large zamindaris, like Ukkadai estate, Poondi estate, Kunniyur estate, Poraiyar Nadar's estate, Kabisthalam estate and Vadapadimangalam estate in the Tanjore District. Gandharvakottai estate, Kallakottai estate and Konur estate situated near the Pudukkottai border. But the bulk of land was held by mirasdars who leased it on regular tenures to pannaiyals or tenants who in turn cultivated the land with the help of labourers.

== History ==
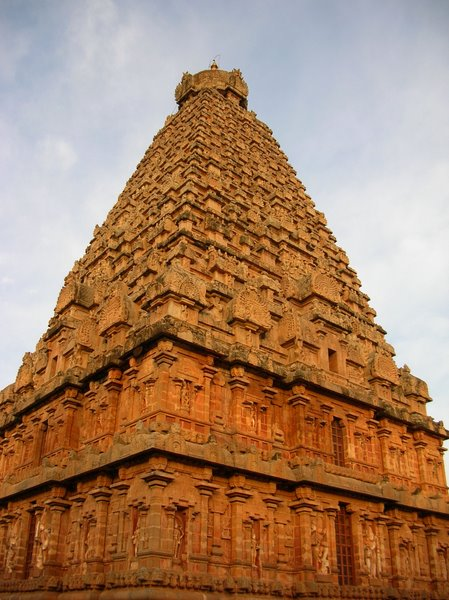
The Brihadeeswarar Temple, Thanjavur c.2007

Tanjore District was inhabited at least since the first millennium B. C. and was the traditional homeland of the Chola Dynasty. The Early Cholas ruled Tanjore from the 3rd century B. C. to the 3rd century A. D. The town of Poompuhar or Kaveripoompattinam served as an important port trading with Rome. Following the Kalabhra interregnum, Tanjore recovered its past glory under the Pallavas and reached the zenith of its prosperity under the Medieval Cholas and Later Cholas. In the 13th century, Tanjore was annexed by the Pandyas who were later defeated by Malik Kafur. Tanjore was ruled for brief periods by the Delhi Sultanate and the Madurai Sultanate, till the 15th century, when it was conquered by the Vijayanagar kings under whom it recovered much of its glory. Tanjore was a part of the Vijayanagar Empire and its successors, the Madurai Nayaks and the Thanjavur Nayaks, until 1674, when it was conquered by Venkoji a brother of Chattrapati Shivaji, who founded the Thanjavur Maratha kingdom. The British East India Company began to play a major part in the affairs of the region from 1749 onwards. In the 1760s and 1770s, the Thanjavur Maratha ruler, the Nawab of Carnatic and other major powers of the region were brought under the British sphere of influence. In 1799, the British East India Company assisted the deposed Thanjavur Maratha king Serfoji II in regaining his throne. In return for British assistance, Serfoji II retained his hold over Tanjore city and ceded the rest of his kingdom to the British East India Company. Tanjore city was eventually annexed by the British as per the Doctrine of Lapse in 1855 on the death of his son Shivaji without a surviving male heir. Tanjore District was created in about 1800, its limits almost the same as that of the preceding Thanjavur Maratha kingdom. Maikondan was a chief of the caste of kallans lived in 17 th-century. He was a brave warrior who ruled areas around Nandavanapatti in Thanjavur. In the year of 1662, Bijapur sultans invaded Thanjavur. During this invasion maikondan fought against sultans and saved all the inhabitants of Thanjavur.

== Demographics ==
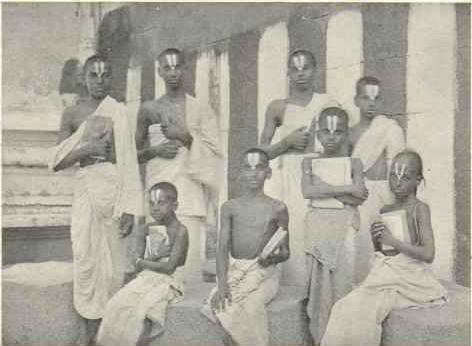
Vaishnavite Brahmin students at a Gurukulam in Tanjore, c.a. 1909

Historical population
Year	Pop.	±%
1871	1,973,731	—
1881	2,130,383	+7.9%
1891	2,228,114	+4.6%
1901	2,245,029	+0.8%
1911	2,362,239	+5.2%
Sources: Imperial Gazetter of India, Volume 23. Clarendon Press. 1908.

Tanjore District covered a total area of 9,600 square kilometres (3,710 sq mi). It had a population of 2,245,029 in 1901. The population density was 234 inhabitants per square kilometre (605/sq mi). As per the 1901 census statistics, Tanjore was the fifth most populous district in the Madras Presidency and the second most densely populated after Madras city. It also had the third highest adult literacy rate (10%) in the Presidency after Madras and Nilgiris, second highest male literacy rate (21%) after Madras city and the seventh highest female literacy rate.

According to the 1901 census, 91 percent of the population was Hindu, 5 percent Muslim and 4 percent Christian. Among Hindus, Paraiyars (310,391), Vanniyars (235,406), Vellalars (212,168), Kallars (188,463), Pallars (159,855), Muthurajas (137,216), and Brahmins (118,882) were the most numerous. Kallars were mainly found in the western part of Tanjore and Pattukkottai taluks. Kallar served in the armies of the Chola kings. The Thanjavur kallar today largely engage in agriculture. Tanjore had the third highest Brahmin population in the Madras Presidency (more than 6%) after South Canara and Ganjam and the highest among the Tamil-speaking districts. Most of the Muslims were Rowthers concentrated in Kumbakonam taluk where they formed the majority in the towns of Ayyampettai, Rajagiri and Pandaravadai apart from Koothanallur in Mannargudi taluk. They were also found in large numbers in the Negapatam and Pattukkottai taluks. More than a third of the total Christian population of the district lived in Tanjore taluk. There were a total of about 600 Jains chiefly concentrated in the Tanjore and Mannargudi taluks. The district was known for its Hindu orthodoxy and several historic Chola temples dedicated to Agamic gods and most of the Padal Petra Sthalam, shrines sung about in the devotional hymns of the Saivite Nayanmars were located here. There was an Advaitic mutt in Kumbakonam (the Kanchi mutt) and Saivite mutts in Thiruvaduthurai, Thiruppanandal and Dharmapuram apart from many Veda pathashalas. The chief Muslim places of worship were located in Tanjore and Muttupet apart from the Nagore dargah.

Tamil was spoken as mother tongue by an overwhelming majority of the population while Telugu was spoken by about 3%. Other languages spoken include Marathi (13,651) and Saurashtra.

== Taluks ==
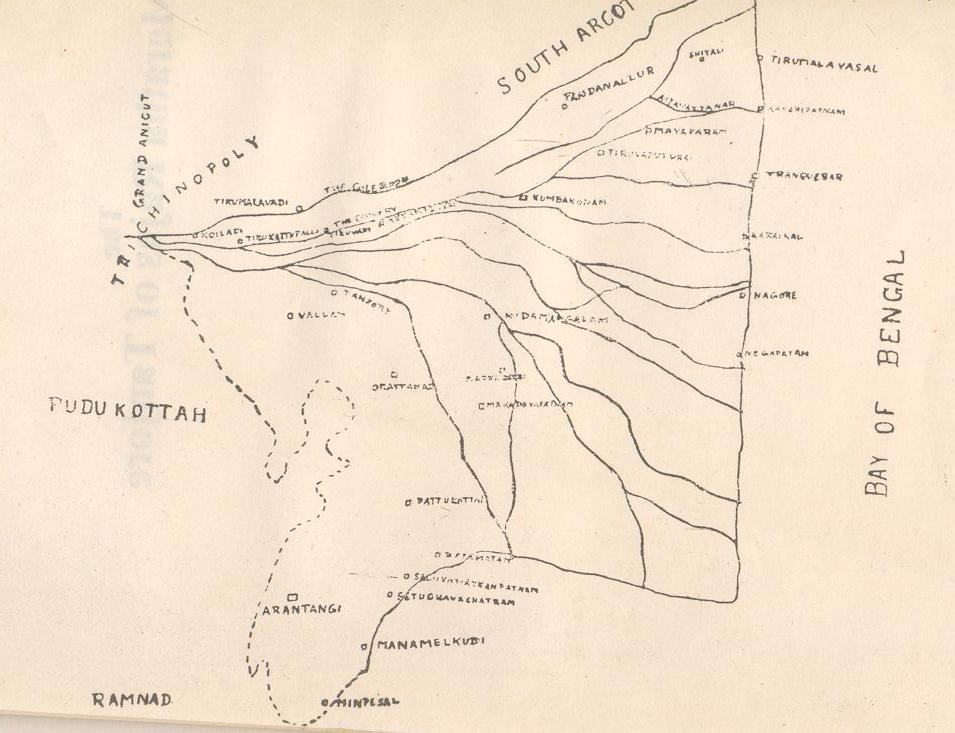
A 1928 Map of the Thanjavur Maratha kingdom. The boundaries correlate almost exactly with that of the Thanjavur District of British India.

As of 1901, Thanjavur District was made up of nine taluks.

- Kumbakonam (Area: 890 square kilometres (342 sq mi); Headquarters: Kumbakonam)
- Mannargudi (Area: 780 square kilometres (301 sq mi); Headquarters: Mannargudi)
- Mayiladuthurai (Area: 730 square kilometres (283 sq mi); Headquarters: Mayavaram)
- Nannilam (Area: 760 square kilometres (293 sq mi); Headquarters: Nannilam)
- Nagapattinam (Area: 620 square kilometres (240 sq mi); Headquarters: Negapatam)
- Pattukkottai (Area: 2,350 square kilometres (906 sq mi); Headquarters: Pattukkottai)
- Sirkazhi (Area: 440 square kilometres (171 sq mi); Headquarters: Shiyali)
- Thanjavur (Area: 1,780 square kilometres (689 sq mi); Headquarters: Tanjore)
- Thiruthuraipoondi (Area: 1,260 square kilometres (485 sq mi); Headquarters: Thiruthuraipoondi)

== Administration ==
The administration of the district was under a District Collector who was from the Indian Civil Service. The District Collector of Tanjore resided at Vallam. The district was sub-divided into six divisions, some of them administered by British civil servants and the rest by Indian Deputy-Collectors. The following were the sub-divisions of the district

- Kumbakonam sub-division: Kumbakonam taluk
- Mannargudi sub-division: Mannargudi and Thiruthiraipundi taluks
- Mayavaram sub-division: Mayavaram and Shiyali taluks
- Negapatam sub-division: Negapatam and Nannilam taluks
- Pattukkottai sub-division: Pattukkottai taluk
- Tanjore sub-division: Tanjore taluk.

As of 1901, there were five municipalities in the district: Kumbakonam, Tanjore, Mannargudi, Mayavaram and Negapatam. From 1800 to 1840, the District Collector of Tanjore was also the agent of Pudukkottai state. However, Pudukkottai was later transferred to the jurisdiction of Madura and then Trichinopoly.

== Economy ==
During British times, Tanjore District was famous for its metal work. Brass, copper and silver utensils were manufactured in large quantities. The South Indian Railway Workshops were established at Negapatam in the 1860s. The chief centres of land trade were Tanjore, Kumbakonam, Mannargudi and Mayiladuthurai, while the chief centres of sea trade were Nagapattinam and Adirampattinam. The town of Kumbakonam was known for its silk sarees and rice and flour mills. It was also one of the leading producers of betel leaves and nuts. Tanjore city was known for silk-weaving, lace, embroidery, jewellery, pithwork and manufacture of metal work and musical instruments.

== List of Collectors ==
The list of district collectors of Tanjore from its formation in December 1799 till the abolition of Madras Province and its conversion to a state on 26 January 1950 is given below:

- Charles Harris (December 1799 - May 1804)
- John Cotton (May 1804-October 1804)
- J. Wallace (Oct 1804-April 1811)
- J. Cotton (May 1811-February 1814)
- James Hapbrew (February 1814-December 1816)
- J. Thackeray (December 1816-September 1817)
- James Hapbrew (September 1817-September 1819)
- G. M. Ogilive (September 1819-February 1820)
- J. Cotton (February 1820-October 1826)
- A. S. Chair (October 1826-February 1827)
- A. D. Campbell (February 1827-January 1828)
- R. Nelson (January - February 1828)
- N. W. Kindersley (February 1828 - July 1839)
- S. Scott (July - August 1839)
- H. C. Montgomery (August 1839-August 1841)
- S. Scott (August 1841)
- J. F. Bishop (January 1842-January 1843)
- S. Scott (January 1843)
- J. F. Bishop (February 1843-May 1844)
- J. J. Cotton (May 1844- September 1844)
- H. C. Montgomery (September 1844-October 1846)
- J. J. Cotton (October 1846-February 1847)
- G. Ellis (July–August 1847)
- J. Bird(November 1847-January 1850)
- I. W. Goodwyr (July 1851-May 1852)
- P. G. Rant (November–December 1852)
- W. M. Cadell (March–April 1853)
- Henry Forbes (April 1853-May 1856)
- W. M. Cadell (May–June 1856)
- J. W. Cherry (June 1856-January 1857)
- H. D. Phillips (January 1857-January 1859)
- G. A. Ballard (February 1859-April 1862)
- G. L. Morris (April 1862-May 1863)
- G. Barbery (May 1863-September 1866)
- W. L. Hathway (February 1870-May 1870)
- H. D. Arbuthnot (April 1873-October 1874)
- H. S. Thomas (October 1874-March 1877)
- F. R. H. Sharp (March 1877-June 1877)
- E. F. Webster (April 1878-June 1881)
- C. S. Crob (June–October 1881)
- F. E. Gibson (October 1881-November 1881)
- D. Brick (November 1881-March 1882)
- F. E. Gibson (April–June 1882)
- W. S. Whiteside (June–August 1882)
- H. E. Stokes (August 1882-June 1883)
- J. B. Penning (June 1883-August 1886)
- E. Gibson (September 1886-September 1889)
- V. A. Happel (September 1889-January 1890)
- E. Gibson (January–May 1890)
- D. Murdack (May 1890)
- J. Thomson (May 1890-July 1891)
- R. N. Campbell (July 1891)
- L. M. Winter (July 1891-August 1893)
- R. B. Clegg (August 1893)
- J. Strooch (August–October 1893)
- L. M. Winter (October 1893-September 1894)
- J. Thomson (September 1894-January 1895)
- R. B. Clegg (January–July 1895)
- E. C. Rovson (July–November 1895)
- Gabriel Stokes (November 1895-May 1896)
- H. Moberly (May–July 1896)
- Gabriel Stokes (July–October 1896)
- J. Andrew (October 1896-June 1897)
- W. B. Agling (June–July 1897)
- J. Andrew (July 1897-March 1898)
- W. B. Agling (April–June 1898)
- J. Twigg (June 1898-April 1900)
- J. Andrew (April 1900-June 1902)
- F. D. P. Oldfield (June–December 1902)
- J. Andrew (December 1902-February 1903)
- H. D. Taylor (February 1903-February 1904)
- R. F. Grimby (March 1904-February 1905)
- E. B. Ellwin (February -December 1905)
- Lionel Davidson (December 1905-November 1906)
- T. P. Bedford (November 1906-June 1910)
- R. F. Austin (June 1910-June 1911)
- N. R. Brodie (November 1911-March 1912)
- J. N. Roy (March–June 1912)
- R. B. Wood (June 1912-August 1916)
- J. R. Huggins (September 1916-April 1920)
- P. C. Dutt (April 1920-July 1921)
- C. E. Jones (July 1921-April 1923)
- H. S. Shield (April 1923-March 1924)
- H. M. Hood (March 1924-December 1925)
- H. S. Shield (December 1925-September 1927)
- S. V. Ramamurthy (September 1927-January 1928)
- Charles Hilton Brown (January–March 1928)
- J. Gray (March 1928-January 1929)
- D. H. Boulton (January–July 1929)
- J. A. Throne (July 1929-June 1931)
- W. Scott Brown (June 1931-March 1932)
- Charles Hilton Brown (April 1932-June 1933)
- A. G. Leach (June–July 1933)
- M. V. Vellodi (July 1933)
- E. R. Wood (July 1933-April 1935)
- M. V. Vellodi (4 April 1935 – 1 June 1936)
- Zinda Sahib Mohazir (2 June 1936 – 8 August 1936)
- Subbiah Naidu (9 August 1936 – 1 April 1937)
- D. D. Warren (1 April 1937 – 25 February 1938)
- H. R. Uzielli (26 February – 1 April 1938)
- Zinda Sahib Mohazir (2 April – 29 August 1938)
- Diwan Bahadur V. N. Viswanatha Rao (30 August 1938 – 25 February 1939)
- R. M. Sundaram (25 February – 7 October 1939)
- C. K. Vijayaraghavan (9 October 1939 – 22 April 1942)
- S. Venkateswaran (23 April 1942 – 10 August 1942)
- M. S. Sivaraman (11 August 1942 – 15 February 1943)
- J. W. Pritchard (16 February 1943 – 22 April 1944)
- Rao Sahib R. D. Paul (24 April 1944 – 31 July 1944)
- Khan Bahadur Mohammad Ismail Saheb Bahadur (1 August 1944 – 20 January 1947)
- J. R. Bett (27 January 1947 – 2 March 1947)
- H. C. McLanghlin (3 March 1947 – 9 April 1949)
- T. K. Sankaravadivelu (10 April 1949 – 26 January 1950)

== Sources ==
- The Imperial Gazetteer of India, Volume 23. London: Clarendon Press. 1908.
