= Venkateswaran =

Venkateswaran may refer to

- A. P. Venkateswaran (1930–2014), Indian diplomat
- G. Venkateswaran (died 2003), Indian film producer
- S. Venkateswaran (1901–1968), Indian civil servant
- Sankar Venkateswaran (born 1979), Indian theatre director
