= Kunniyur estate =

Feudal estate in Tiruvarur, Tamil Nadu, India

Kunniyur estate was a mirasdari estate in the Tiruvarur district of Tamil Nadu, India. Previously located in Tanjore district, it was one of the four great feudal estates of the Cauvery Delta. Headquartered in the town of Kunniyur, the "mirasdari" covered more than 6000 acres.

The most well known among the mirasdars was Kunniyur Sambasiva Iyer, who was a member of the Indian National Congress from the early 1930s. He was elected to the Madras Legislative Council and served as a member of the legislature until his defeat at the hands of the Communist Party of India in the 1952 elections. He was also an ardent devotee of the Paramacharya of Kanchi.

Kunniyur was the center of a large-scale peasant uprising in 1944. The agricultural workers in the estate joined the Communists agriculturists' union and agitated for enhanced wages and benefits. Twenty-three people were arrested, and in 1945 a law was passed outlawing Communist meetings in Mannargudi taluk. The strike turned violent when in 1948, most of the agricultural land in the eastern part of Thanjavur district was seized by Communist labourers. A special law reinforcing the Madras Maintenance of Public Order Act of 1848 was enacted and the rebellion was crushed through large-scale arrests under the new law. Consequently, an understanding was reached between the landlords and labourers as a result of the Mayuram Agreement of October 1948 and the Tanjore Tenants and Pannaiyals Ordinance of 1952 .
