= Ukkadai =

- village
- Location in Tamil Nadu, India Ukkadai (India)
- Coordinates: 10.9333°N 79.2833°E
- Country: India
- State: Tamil Nadu
- District: Thanjavur
- Taluk: Papanasam

Population (2001)
  - Total: 2,045

Languages
  - Official: Tamil
- Time zone: UTC+5:30 (IST)
- PIN: 614401

Ukkadai is a village in the Papanasam taluk of Thanjavur district, Tamil Nadu, India. It is the administrative centre of the erstwhile Ukkadai estate.

== Demographics ==
As per the 2001 census, Ukkadai had a total population of 2,045 with 1,012 males and 1,033 females. The sex ratio was 1021. The literacy rate was 66.63.
