= Government Raja Mirasdar Hospital =

Geography
- Location: Tamil Nadu, India
- Coordinates: 10.785576°N 79.136389°E

Organisation
- Type: District General

History
- Founded: 1876

Links
- Lists: Hospitals in India

Government Raja Mirasdar Hospital is a state-run hospital located in Thanjavur, Tamil Nadu, India. Established in 1876, the hospital has been providing services to various neighbouring districts including Thanjavur, Tiruvarur, Nagapattinam, Tiruchy, Pudukottai, Perambalur, Ariyalur, Cuddalore, Karur and their suburbs.

== History ==
In 1876, Tanjore Collector Henry Sullivan Thomas decided to build a hospital in Tanjore to cater to the needs of the people of the district. He requested the Tanjore–Maratha Queen, Kamatchi Amba Bai, for support, and the Queen donated her 40-acre property to the British to build the hospital. The Tanjore Raja family's charity contributed ₹30,000.

In addition, members of a Vishwakarma Brahmin family—Somasundaram Patter, Ramalinga Patter, and Thiayagraja Patter—who served as nattamais (village heads) during that period, donated 24 acres of land opposite the Big Temple for the hospital. Their family is traditionally described as landlords and jewellery traders, and regarded as elite mirasdars of Thanjavur.

The collector also contacted several prominent mirasdars of Tanjore for donations to build the hospital. Thiruppanandal Adheenam Ramalinga Thampiran, Thavsumuthu Nadar of the Poraiyar Nadar estate, Duraisamy Moopanar of the Kabisthalam estate, and Veeraiya Vandayar of the Poondi estate made donations to support the institution.

Since donations were received from both the Raja's family and the mirasdars, the hospital was named Raja Mirasdar Hospital.
