= Nungambakkam Village (Thiruvallur district) =

Coordinates: 13°04′05″N 79°53′36″E

Nungambakkam village in Thiruvallur district, is a small Gram Panchayat in the state of Tamil Nadu, India. The village was originally a Zamindari Mitta under the Madras Presidency, formalised in the early 19th century, it is often confused with the more well-known Neighbourhood also called Nungambakkam which is part of Chennai city. However, they are not the same.

== Economy and industry ==
The leading sector in the village is agriculture, followed by rising residential demand. The village is surrounded by Erayamangalam to the south, Kammavarpalayam and Melnallathur to the north.

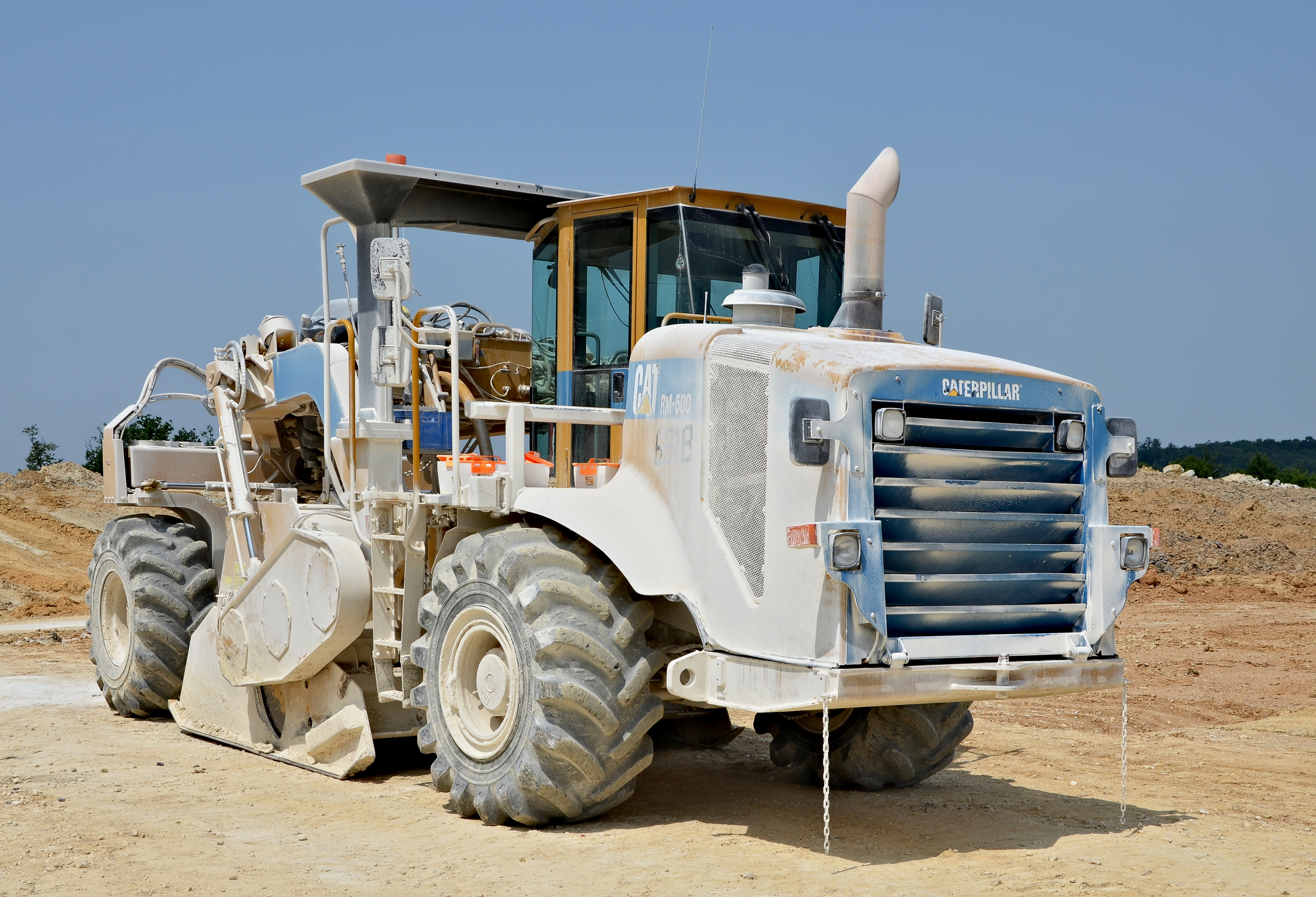
Caterpillar vehicle. (parts of which are manufactured in the plant nearby).

The Village is close to the Caterpillar construction plant established in Melnallathur.

Thiruvallur, 5.6 kilometers away is the nearest major town to the village, the nearest major railway station is in the town of Manavalanagar, 4 kilometers away.

The village has access to the town buses and rickshaws.

== History ==
The Original history of the village is said to have been largely populated by Iyengars and Telugu Kammas and their communities until the early mid-19th century after which other communities moved in, the Zamindari settlement was formalized by the British and the village was a Mitta till 1948.

The original Zamindar of the Nungambakkam Mitta was Thatipatri Raja Rao, a Telugu Zamindar as is mentioned in Maclean's 1877 administrative records. It was later sold in 1900 to members of the Pillai-Pari family, the original Mitta consisted of fifteen other smaller villages and settlements and paid a peshkash of 544 rupees in 1877.

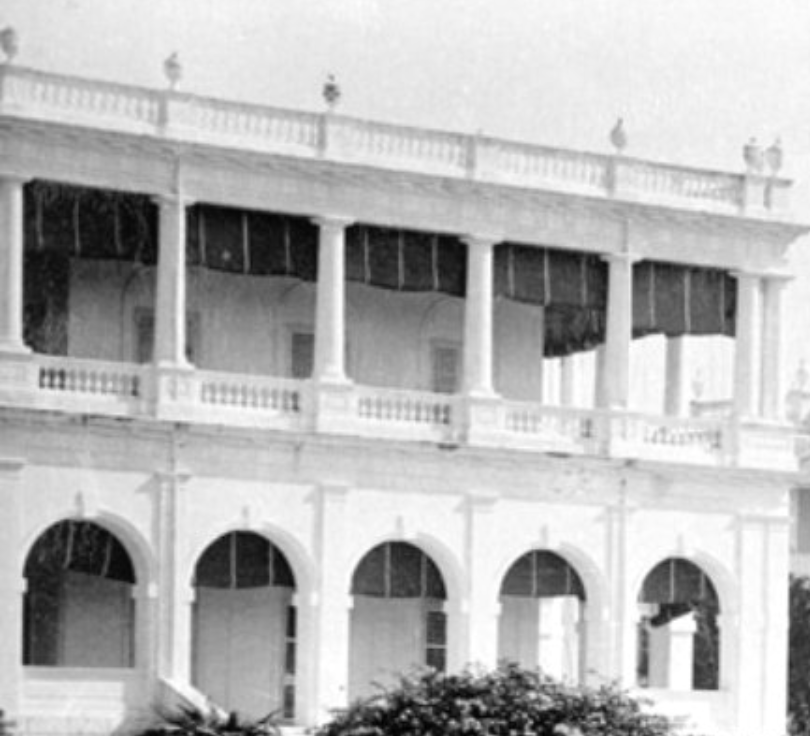
Nungambakkam Mitta Zamindar's house photo taken circa 1910s.

The Village was a Mitta from the early-19th-century estate till 1948 after the land reforms in India, is currently a Gram Panchayat in Tamil Nadu. The village is well known for its Perumal and Amman temples.

In 1900 a colonial house was built for the Zamindar, resembling Madras Club on Mount Road, the palace was burned by a fire in the 1950s, and very little of it remains.

The adjacent village Kammavarpalayam, is said to have been originally ruled by Teulgu Nayaka lords during the Vijayanagara era, notably the Kammavars.

The Nungambakkam village falls under the Thiruvallur assembly constituency, with the Pincode of 602002. The village has a population of 1,554 of which 768 are males while 786 are females per Population Census 2011.
