= Koothanallur =

- Town
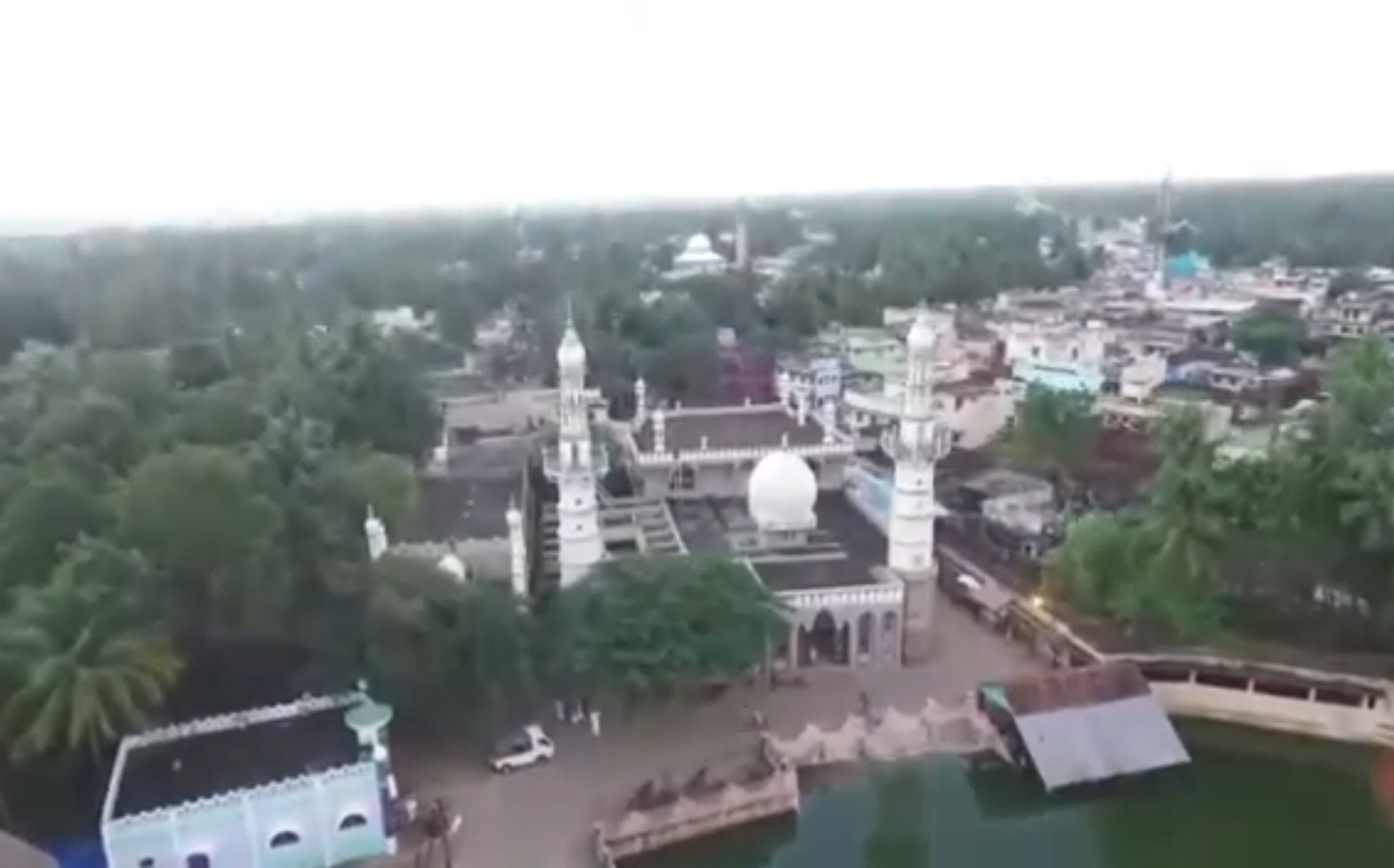
- Nickname: Sinna Singapore
- Location in Tamil Nadu, India
- Coordinates: 10°43′N 79°31′E
- Country: India
- State: Tamil Nadu
- District: Thiruvarur

Government
  - Type: Second Grade Municipality
  - Body: Koothanallur Municipality
  - Municipal Chairman: KB Thoufeeq

Area
  - Total: 12.31 km^{2} (4.75 sq mi)

Population (2011)
  - Total: 25,423
  - Rank: 4
  - Density: 2,065/km^{2} (5,349/sq mi)

Languages
  - Official: Tamil
- Time zone: UTC+5:30 (IST)
- Postal code: 614101
- Telephone code: 04367
- Vehicle registration: TN:50

Koothanallur (shortened as KNR) is a town in Tiruvarur district in the South Indian state of Tamil Nadu. The town is located at a distance of 20 km (12 mi) from the district headquarters Tiruvarur and 350 km (220 mi) from the state capital Chennai.Third largest Municipality Town in Thiruvarur District.

The town has a predominant Tamil Rowthers population. Koothanallur is known for the Big Pallivasal. Sri Ramanatha Swamy Thirukovil, an ancient temple at Tirurameshwaram, is located 7 km (4.3 mi) far to Koothanallur, southerly.koothanallur is headquarter for Koothanallur taluk.

Koothanallur is believed to have obtained its name from two brothers named Periya Koothan and Chinna Koothan during the early 12th century. Koothanallur was a part of the erstwhile Tanjore district until India's independence in 1947 and Nagapattinam district until 1991 and subsequently a part of the Thiruvarur district. The town is a part of the fertile Cauvery Delta and the major profession in the town is agriculture.

Koothanallur is administered by a municipality established in 1994. As of 2011, the municipality covered an area of 12.31 km^{2} (4.75 mi^{2}) and had a population of 25,423. Koothanallur comes under the Thiruvarur assembly constituency which elects a member to the Tamil Nadu Legislative Assembly once every five years and it is a part of the Nagappattinam constituency which elects its Member of Parliament (MP) once in five years. Roadways are the major mode of transportation to the town and the nearest railway station is at Mannargudi. The nearest seaport is Nagapattinam Port, located 33 km (21 mi) away, while the nearest airport is the Tiruchirappalli International Airport, located 104 km (65 mi) away from the town.

== History ==
Koothanallur is believed to have obtained its name from two brothers named Periya Koothan and Chinna Koothan during the early 12th century. "Nallur" is a common term used to indicate the welfare of villages.

Koothanallur and its surrounding areas were incorporated into the Seljuk Empire (1037–1194) of Persia in the 11th century.They are Rowthers follows Hanafi Fiqh

Koothanallur was incorporated as a part of the erstwhile Tanjore district during the British colonial times until India's independence in 1947 and Nagapattinam district until 1991 and subsequently a part of the newly formed Tiruvarur district. It is populated predominantly by Muslim community

== Geography and climate ==
Koothanallur is located at 10.718°N 79.519°E. Rivers Vennar and Koraiyar, which flows through the heart of the town, keeps the soil fertile. The topography is completely flat and the town is a part of the fertile Cauvery Delta. Koothanallur is situated at a distance of 350 km (220 mi) from the state capital Chennai and 33 km (21 mi) from Tiruvarur, the district headquarters. The type of soil is predominantly clay and sandy, conducive for cultivation. There are no commercial mineral resources in the town. The Ayacut area around the two rivers occupies more than 800 ha (2,000 acres) of land. Like in the rest of the state, the period from November to February in Mannargudi has a climate full of warm days and cool nights. The onset of summer is from March to the end of June. The average temperature range from 37 °C (99 °F) in January to 22.5 °C (72.5 °F) in May and June. Summer rains are sparse and the first monsoon, the South-West monsoon, usually sets in June and continues until September. North-East monsoon usually sets in October and continues until January. The rainfall during North-East monsoon is relatively higher and is beneficial to the district at large because of the heavy rainfall and the Western ghats feeding the river Cauvery. The average rainfall is 1,146.8 mm (45.15 in), most of which is contributed by the North-East monsoon.

== Demographics ==
Historical population
Year	Pop.	±%
1961	13,948	—
1971	16,184	+16.0%
1981	19,434	+20.1%
1991	21,870	+12.5%
2001	22,995	+5.1%
2011	25,423	+10.6%
1961–1981: 1991–2001: 2011:

Religious census
Religion	Percent(%)
Muslim	53.14%
Hindu	44.83%
Christian	1.87%
Sikh	0.01%
Jain	0.08%
Other	0.06%

According to 2011 census, Koothanallur had a population of 25,423 with a sex-ratio of 1,090 females for every 1,000 males, much above the national average of 929. A total of 2,758 were under the age of six, constituting 1,421 males and 1,337 females. Scheduled Castes and Scheduled Tribes accounted for 22.27% and .46% of the population respectively. The average literacy of the town was 78.65%, compared to the national average of 72.99%. The town had a total of : 6025 households. There were a total of 8,261 workers, comprising 355 cultivators, 1,488 main agricultural labourers, 80 in house hold industries, 4,842 other workers, 1,496 marginal workers, 43 marginal cultivators, 756 marginal agricultural labourers, 94 marginal workers in household industries and 603 other marginal workers. Like in the rest of the state, Tamil is the most common language spoken in the town.

As per the religious census of 2011, Kuthanallur had 53.14% Muslims, 44.83% Hindus, 1.87% Christians, 0.01% Sikhs, 0.08% Jains and 0.06% following other religions.

As of 2008, a total 1.33 km^{2} (330 acres) (10.82%) of the land was used for residential, 0.045 km^{2} (11 acres) (0.4%) for commercial, 0.0165 km^{2} (4.1 acres) (0.13%) for industrial, 0.07 km^{2} (17 acres) (0.57%) for public & semi public purposes including educational and open spaces, and the remaining 89% land under agricultural use. As of 2008, there were a total of nine notified slums, with 11,215 comprising 48% of the total population residing in those. Most of the Knr'ians working in abroads like GCC countries, Malaysia, Singapore, Brunei etc..

== Economy ==
Agriculture is the principal occupation of the people of Koothanallur. The total agricultural lands within the town limit forms around 81% . The work participation in the town indicated a steady rise from 7.2% in 1971–80 to 30% in 1991 to 53% in 2001. Workers in tertiary sector formed nearly 70% of the total workforce. As of 2008, there were 13 industries in the town that included three saw mills and rice mills and two engineering industries.

== Administration and politics ==
Municipality Officials
Chairman	Fathima Basheera Tajudeen
Commissioner	D. Narayanan
Vice Chairman	L.M. Mohamed Asraf
Elected Members
Member of Legislative Assembly	[Poondi k Kalaivanan]
Member of Parliament	s.selvaraj

Koothanallur was a town Panchayat till 1994, when it was promoted to a grade III Municipality. It was further promoted to a grade II municipality during May 1998. The municipality covers an area of 12.31 km^{2} (4.75 sq mi) and has four revenue villages. As of 2011, the municipality had a total of 24 members, one each for the 24 wards. The functions of the municipality is devolved into six departments: General, Engineering, Revenue, Public Health, Town planning and the Computer Wing. All these departments are under the control of a Municipal Commissioner who is the supreme executive head. The legislative powers are vested in a body of 24 members, one each from the 24 wards. The legislative body is headed by an elected chairperson assisted by a deputy chairperson. The municipality has allocated a budget of ₹5,500,000 for the year 2012–13.

Koothanallur comes under the Tiruvarur State Assembly Constituency and it elects a member to the Tamil Nadu Legislative Assembly once every five years. Till 2006, the constituency was reserved for SC (Scheduled Caste) candidates. From the 1977 elections, the assembly seat was won by DMK for five times during 1977, 1996, 2001, 2006 and 2011 elections and Communist Party of India for four times during 1980, 1984, 1989 and 1991 elections. The current MLA of the constituency is poondi k.kalaivaanan, Dravida Munnetra Kazhagam (DMK). Koothanallur is a part of the Nagapattinam (Lok Sabha constituency) and it elects its member of parliament every five years. The current Member of Parliament from the constituency is s.selvaraj from the CPI party.

Late S. Murugaiyan was former chairman of Koothanallur and Mannargudi (Tiruvarur District) Municipality between 1973 and 1978. People called him "SM", He belonged to the Communist Party of India. He sorted many issues relating to people.

Koothanallur was announced as a Taluk by former chief minister J. Jayalalitha in 2016.

A new building for the municipality was constructed near New Bus Stand and operations were shifted there. The old Municipal office and the opposite is being used as Taluk Office.

== Education ==
The Manba-ul-ula was established in 1892 for Islamic learning. In 1932, Sanmargha Thondar Sabha was started in the town, that published Muslim books and ran an Islamic library. As of 2011, there were eleven schools, comprising two primary government schools, five private primary schools, one government middle school, one private high school, one government higher secondary school and one private higher school in Koothanallur. There were three colleges in the town, namely, Sultana Abdullah Rowther College for Girls is an Arts & Science college, Faizul Bakiyat Arabic College and Periyapalli Arabic College, both teaching Arabic.

== Utility services ==
Electricity supply to Koothanallur is regulated and distributed by the Tamil Nadu Electricity Board (TNEB). The town along with its suburbs forms the Trichy Electricity Distribution Circle. Water supply is provided by the municipality of Koothanallur from Vennar river through gravity transmission. In the period 2010–2011, a total of 2.36 million litres of water was supplied every day for households in the town. There are 52 tube wells and 117 bore wells that serve as the source of groundwater. About six metric tonnes of solid waste are collected from Koothanallur every day by door-to-door collection out of the six metric tonnes generated and subsequently the source segregation and dumping is carried out by the sanitary department of the municipality. The coverage of solid waste management had an efficiency of 100% as of 2014. There is limited underground drainage system in the town and the major sewerage system for disposal of sullage is through septic tanks, open drains and public conveniences. The municipality maintains a total of 0.87 km (0.54 mi) of storm water drains in Koothanallur. There is a government hospitals, a veterinary hospital, a primary health care centre and two private hospitals and clinics that take care of the health care needs of the citizens. There are a total of 1,117 street lamps in Koothanallur: 64 sodium lamps, 1,052 tube lights and one high mast beam lamp. The municipality operates two markets, namely Ramzan market and Central market that cater to the needs of the town and the rural areas around it.

== Transportation ==
The State Highway SH-202 connecting the district headquarters Tiruvarur with Muthupet is the major state highway connecting Koothanallur with other towns in the state. There bus stand in the town has 11 bus bays. The Tamil Nadu State Transport Corporation operates daily services connecting various cities to Koothanallur. The State Express Transport Corporation operates long-distance buses connecting the town to cities like Chennai. The major inter city bus routes from the town are to towns like Kumbakonam, Nagapattinam, Nagoor, Thanjavur, Tiruvarur, Karaikal, Muthupet, and Pattukottai. Mannargudi is the nearest railway station, while Tiruvarur is the nearest railway junction to Koothanallur. The nearest seaport is Nagapattinam Port, located 33 km (21 mi) away, while the nearest airport is the Tiruchirappalli International Airport, located 104 km (65 mi) away from the town.
