= K. Thulasiah Vandayar =

Indian politician (1929–2021)

- Born: Krishnasami Thulasiah Vandayar; 11 May 1929; Poondi, Thanjavur district, Tamilnadu
- Died: 17 May 2021 (aged 92)
- Occupation: politician
- Spouse: Padmavathi
- Children: Krishnasamy Vandayar Bhuvaneshwari

Krishnasami Thulasiah Vandayar (11 May 1929 – 17 May 2021) was an Indian politician and head of the Poondi estate in the Thanjavur district of Tamil Nadu, India. He belongs to prominent Kallar community. He was the member of Lok Sabha for Thanjavur from 1991 to 1996. He was the chairman of the Managing Committee of the AVVM Pushpam College. He died on 17 May 2021 (Monday) at Chennai Saligram.

== Early life ==
Vandayar was born on 11 May 1929 to A. Krishnasami Vandayar, the zamindar of Poondi. He was educated at the Loyola College, Chennai.

== Personal life ==
Vandayar married Padmavathi and had one son T Krishnasamy Vandayar and a daughter.

== Political career ==
Vandayar was a member of the Indian National Congress from an early age. In the 1991 Lok Sabha elections, he was elected from the Thanjavur Lok Sabha constituency defeating S. S. Palanimanickam of the Dravida Munnetra Kazhagam party. He served till the 1996 elections which he lost. Vandayar served as the president of the Thanjavur District Congress Committee.
