= Gandharvakottai estate =

Gandharvakottai estate was the largest zamindari estate in Tanjore district. The headquarters was the town of Gandharvakottai. Composed of two disjointed enclaves, the zamindari was surrounded on three sides by the Tanjore taluk of Tanjore district and on the south-west by princely state of Pudukkottai. The two disjointed enclaves were separated by the Kallakottai estate. The zamindari was abolished when India became independent in 1947 and was constituted into the Gandharvakottai taluk. Gandharvakottai taluk was transferred to Pudukkottai district in the 1990s.
