= V. Appasamy Vandayar =

Indian politician

Rao Bahadur V. Appasamy Vandayar was an Indian politician, and head of the Poondi estate in the Thanjavur district of Tamil Nadu, India. He belonged to the Kallar community. He was a member of the Justice party and was elected to the Madras Presidency Legislative Council in the 1920 election.
