= Anegundi Raj =

Anegundi Raj is an estate in the then Ballari district, British Raj, present in the Gangavathi taluk, Koppal district in the Indian state of Karnataka. After the downfall of the Vijayanagara Empire at Chandragiri, the last emperor Sri Ranga III named Rama Raya recovered some part of his ancestral dominion and retained Anegundi, part of Chitaldurgam and part of Harpanahalli as a jagir from the Muslim government.

== Origin ==
Originally they belonged to the Aravidu dynasty, (The fourth dynasty that ruled the Vijayanagara Empire). The daughter of Krishnadevaraya was married to Aliya Rama Raya and thus the empire passed in to them.

== Estate Management ==
The Jagirdars of Anegundi enjoyed the estate under the Mughal Empire till 1749 and later under the Marathas till 1775 when Tipu Sultan overran the then Raja Timmappa and burnt the town of Anegundi.

After Tipu's action the Raja fled to Nizam dominions, where he stayed a fugitive till 1791 and then again in 1799 recaptured his estate back. Later English handed over the estate to Nizam and the Raja turned out to be the pensioner and was termed the Raja of Anegundi.

== Raja's of Anegundi ==
- 1.) Sri Ranga IV (1665-1678)
- 2.) Venkatapathi (1678-1680)
- 3.) Sri Ranga (1680-1692)
- 4.) Venkata Raya (1692-1706)
- 5.) Sri Ranga Raya (1706-1716)
- 6.) Mahadevaraya (1716-1724)
- 7.) Sri Ranga Raya (1724-1729)
- 8.) Venkata Raya (1729-1732)
- 9.) Rama (1732-1739)
- 10.) Venkatapati Raya (1739-1744)
- 11.) Timmappa
- 12.) Venkatapati (1791-1793)

After 1802 settlement

- 13.) Tirumala Raja
- 14.) -
- 15.) Grand Daughter of Tirumala Raja.
- 16.) Tirumala Deva ( Her son)
- 17.) Venkata Rama Raya ( First son of Tirumala Deva )
- 18.) Krishnadevaraya ( Second son of Tirumala Deva )
- 19.) Narasimha Raja ( Third son of Tirumala Deva)

(The above list is given by Robert Sewell in 1883).
