= Nagapattinam Port =

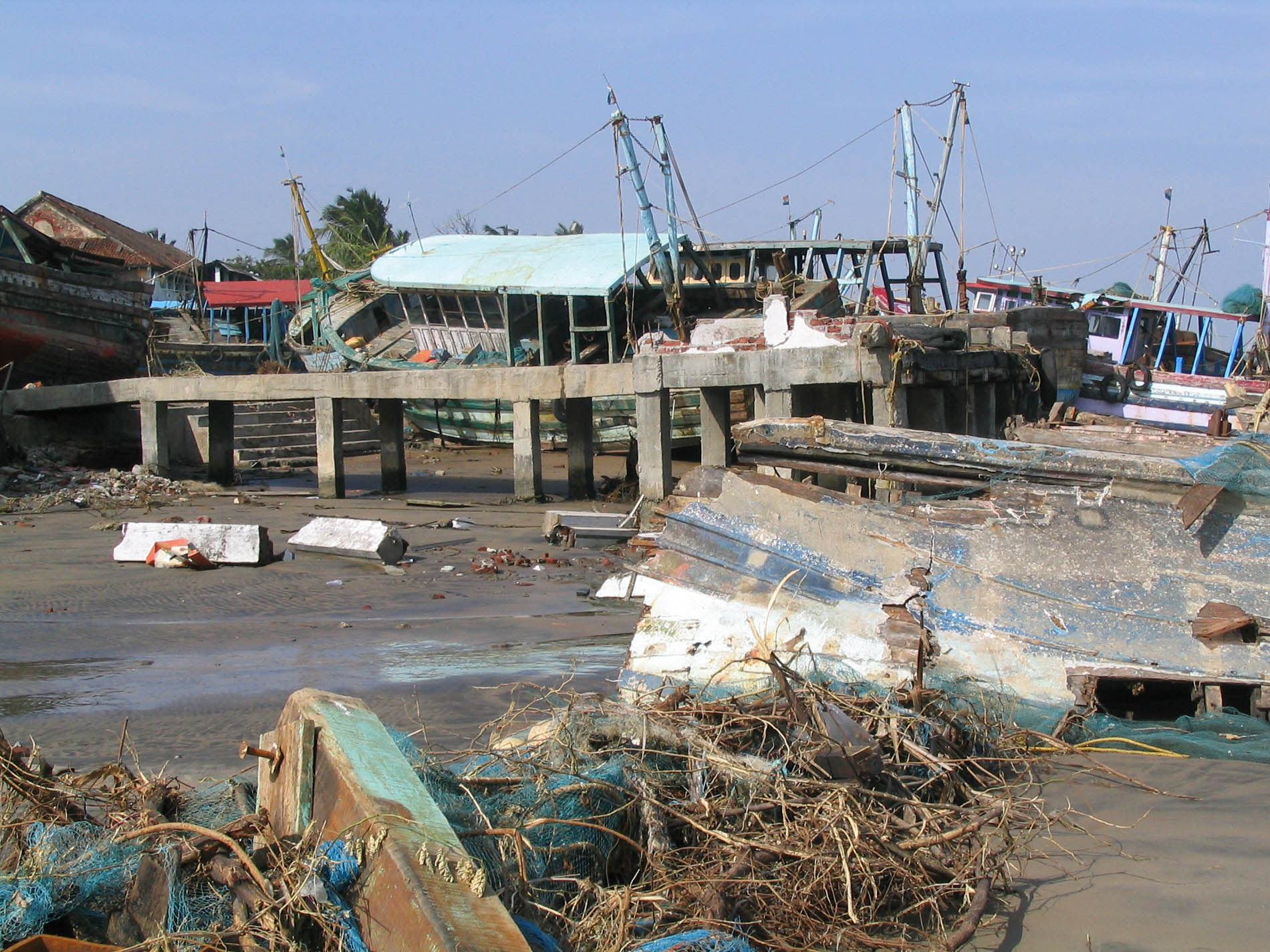
- Nagapattinam Port in 2004
- Interactive map of Nagapattinam Port

Location
- Country: India
- Location: Nagapattinam
- Coordinates: 10°45′50.6″N 79°50′58.5″E
- UN/LOCODE: IN NGG

Details
- Opened: 1881; 145 years ago
- Operated by: Nagapattinam Port Trust
- Owned by: Nagapattinam Port Trust, Ministry of Ports, Shipping and Waterways, Government of India
- Type of harbour: Coastal breakwater, artificial, large seaport
- UN/LOCODE: INNAA

Statistics
- Annual cargo tonnage: 10 lakh tonnes (2017–18)

Nagapattinam Port (nākappaṭṭinam, previously spelt Nagapatnam or Negapatam) is a port in the South Indian town of Nagapattinam in the Indian state of Tamil Nadu. It is a natural port located in the shores of Bay of Bengal. The port came to prominence during the period of Medieval Cholas (9th −12th century CE) and served as their important port for commerce and east bound naval expeditions. Nagapattinam was settled by the Portuguese and, later, the Dutch under whom it served as the capital of Dutch Coromandel from 1660 to 1781 CE. In November 1781, the town was conquered by the British East India Company. The port was an important port for the colonial empires until Thoothukudi port became the primary port in the Coromandel Coast.

The modern day port has a commercial port complex and a dockyard that are protected by a river mouth sand bar facing the port. The port handles only limited amount of edible oil imports. The Nagapttinam lighthouse is the first conventional 20-metre-high (66 ft) lighthouse tower built inside the port premises by the British in 1869. The port and the lighthouse are maintained by the Tamil Nadu Maritime Board under the Government of India.

== Geography ==
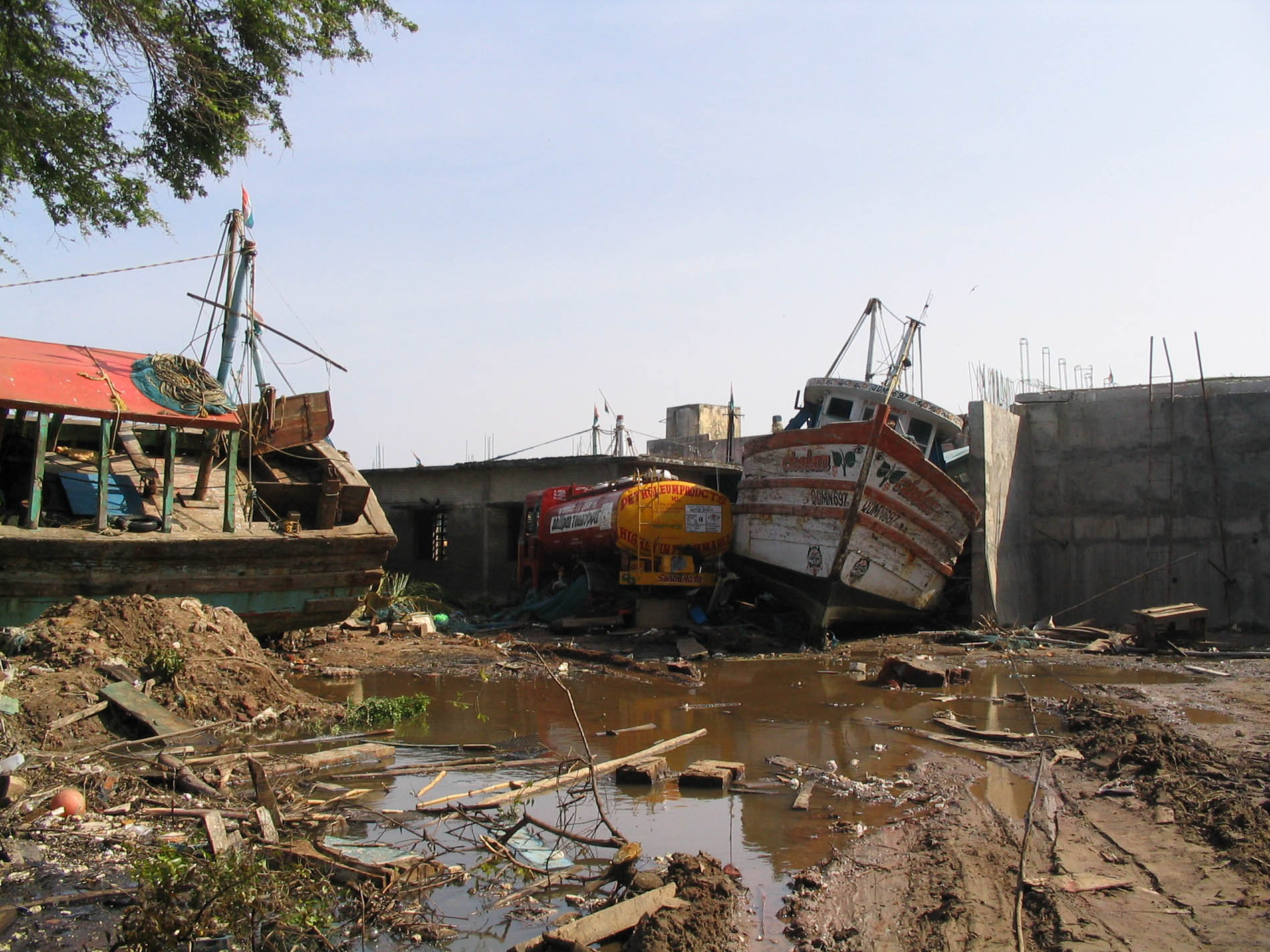
Section of port damaged by Indian Ocean Tsunami in 2004

The port of Nagapattinam is located in the town of Nagapattinam, a town in the South Indian state of Tamil Nadu, on the banks of Bay of Bengal and in the mouth of river Kuduvayyar. The coast along the port is generally flat and the depths along the coast is shallow. Historically, the underwater ridge along the coast is a navigational hazard. The port is deemed unsafe for anchorage especially during the receding monsoon season of November and December. Till Tsunami in 2004, a small bridge connected a village named Keechakuppam with Nagapattinam town. The construction of an expanded and an elevated bridge was completed after 2008, which enabled the expansion of the port as well as the fishing harbour. The adjacent land of the port has Kudavayar backwater. As is the case with the Kaveri river tributaries, the estuarine portion of the mouth of Kudavayyar to Bay of Bengal is shallow. The adjoining land once was filled with mangroves, but now remains a marshy land. Post Tsunami, many self help groups and the forest department of the Government of Tamil Nadu have been actively involved in creating bioshields, by planting mangrove forest to prevent effects of future disaster.

== History ==
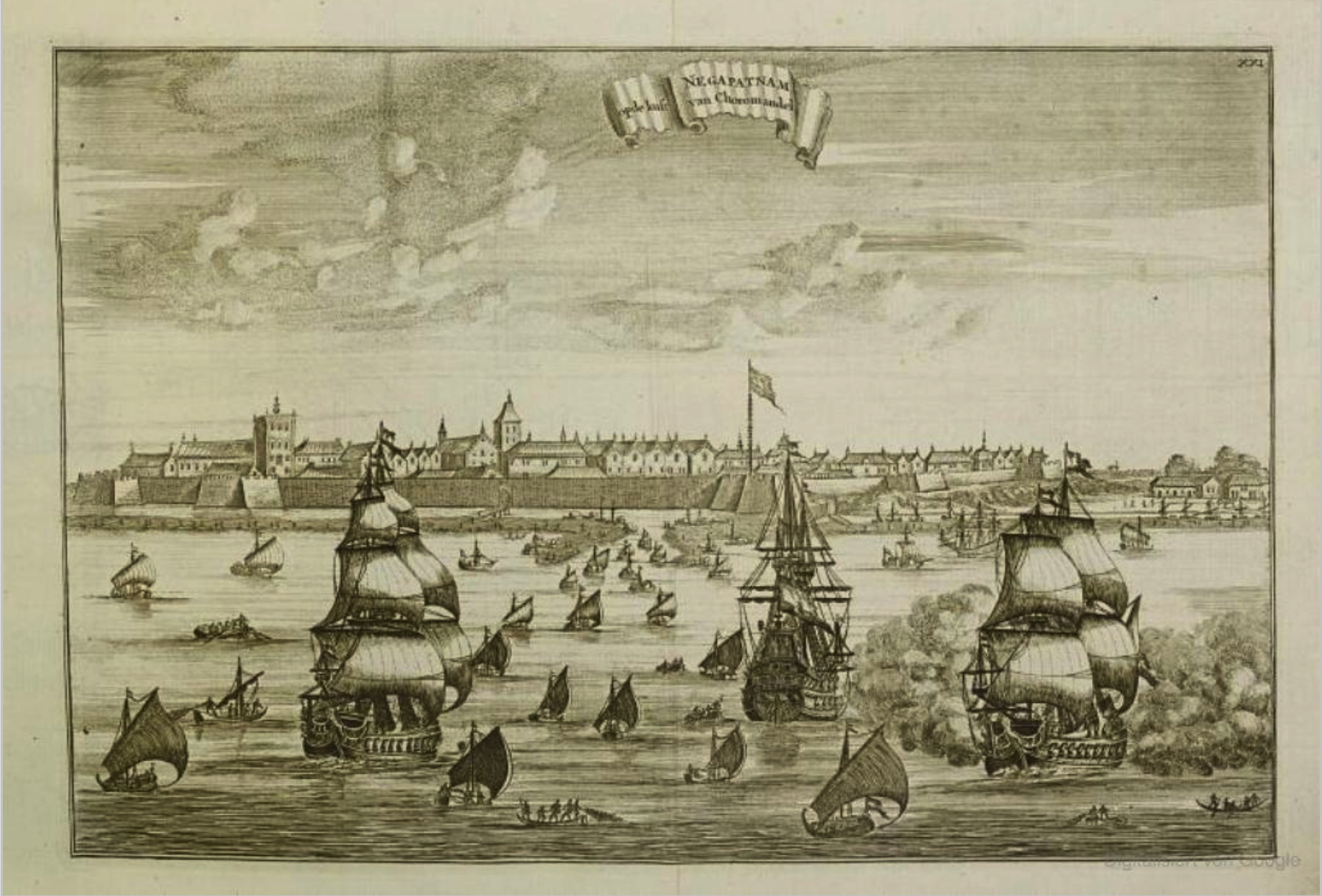
Painting of boats in Nagapattinam Port

The port came to prominence during the period of Medieval Cholas (9th −12th century CE) and served as their important port for commerce and east bound naval expeditions. All the eastern naval expeditions of Rajendra Chola I (1012–44 CE) were through the port. In the early 16th century the Portuguese started commercial contacts with the town through the port and established a commercial centre in 1554 CE. The Portuguese also conducted missionary enterprise in the town. In 1658, the Dutch established an agreement between King Vijaya Nayakkar of Thanjavur on 5 January 1662. Ten villages were transferred from the Portuguese to the Dutch – Nagapattinam Port, Puthur, Muttam, Poruvalancheri, Anthanappettai, Karureppankadu, AzhingiMangalam, Sangamangalam, Thiruthinamangalam, Manjakollai, Nariyankudi. As per agreement between the first Maratta King Ekoji of Thanjavur and the Dutch, Naagapattinam and surrounding villages were handed over to the Dutch on 30 December 1676. In 1690, the capital of Dutch Coromandel changed from Pulicat to Nagapattinam.

This town fell into the hands of the British in 1781 after the two naval battles between British and French fleets were fought off the coast of Negapatam, as it was then known: the first in 1758 as part of the Seven Years' War and the second in 1782 as part of the American Revolutionary War. The town was taken by the British from the Dutch in 1781 (who had been formally brought into the war in 1780). When the Dutch and British reached a peace agreement in 1784, Nagapattinam was formally ceded to the British. 277 villages with Nagore as the headquarters were handed over to the East India Company.

From 1799 to 1845 CE Nagapttinam was the headquarters of Tanjore district. The town remained one of the chief ports to the Madras Presidency. The port suffered decline after the inclusion of Tranquebar and Tuticorin ports. The port was one of the ports severely affected by the tsunami which followed the 2004 Indian Ocean earthquake.

== Commercial activities ==
Nagapattinam was the most important port of the Chola empire. The port was also widely used by the Dutch, Portuguese and British as one of the major ports in Coramandel Coast for trading purposes. Most of the principal exports to Sri Lanka from the port during the British period were rice, piece goods, live stock, cigars, tobacco and skin. The trade of Nagapattinam was mostly with Ceylon, Straits Settlements, Burma and to a small extent to the United Kingdom and Spain. The port also served passenger traffic to Singapore, but was suspended due to a fire accident. The modern day port has a commercial port complex and a dockyard that are protected by a river mouth sand bar facing the port. The port handles only limited amount of edible oil imports. The Nagapattinam lighthouse is the first conventional 20-metre-high (66 ft) lighthouse tower built inside the port premises by the British in 1869. The port and the lighthouse are maintained by the Tamil Nadu Maritime Board under the Government of India. The port has been planned to have a green field, all weather and enhancing capacity to handle 10 lakh tonnes of cargo every year, but the expansion has been opposed by fishing community. The central government plan to convert the port into an economic zone under Sagar Mala project is also opposed by the fishing community fearing restrictions.
