= S. Venkateswaran =

Sundaram Ayyar Venkateswaran CIE (2 January 1901 - June 1968) was a civil servant of the Indian Civil Service who served as Census Commissioner of Madras State during the 1951 census (the first Indian to hold the post) and the Chief Election Commissioner of Madras Presidency (later Madras State) from 26 June 1948 to 22 August 1952. He also served as Commissioner of Land Revenue for Madras State and Vice-President of the Madras Music Academy.

== Early life and education ==
Venkateswaran was born on 2 January 1901 to Sundaram Ayyar of Pattamadai in Tinnevely district. He studied at Presidency College, Madras and Oxford University. Venkateswaran passed the civil service examinations and joined the Indian Civil Service on 30 November 1925.

== Career ==
Venkateswaran joined the civil service as Assistant Collector and Magistrate and subsequently served as District Collector of South Canara, South Arcot, West Godavari, Guntur and Tanjore districts. Venkateswaran was Provincial Textile Commissioner for the Madras Presidency from 1942 to 1946 and Collector of Chingleput District from 1946 to 1948. Venkateswaran was made a Companion of the Order of the Indian Empire in the 1946 Birthday Honours. On 26 June 1948, Venkateswaran was appointed Chief Election Commissioner of the Madras Presidency and oversaw the 1952 Madras Legislative Assembly elections and Lok Sabha elections. He also served as the Census Commissioner of Madras state for the 1951 census, the first since independence and the first Indian to hold the post.
