= Rowther =

South Indian predominant Muslim community

இராவுத்தர்/ராவுத்தர்/റാവുത്തർ
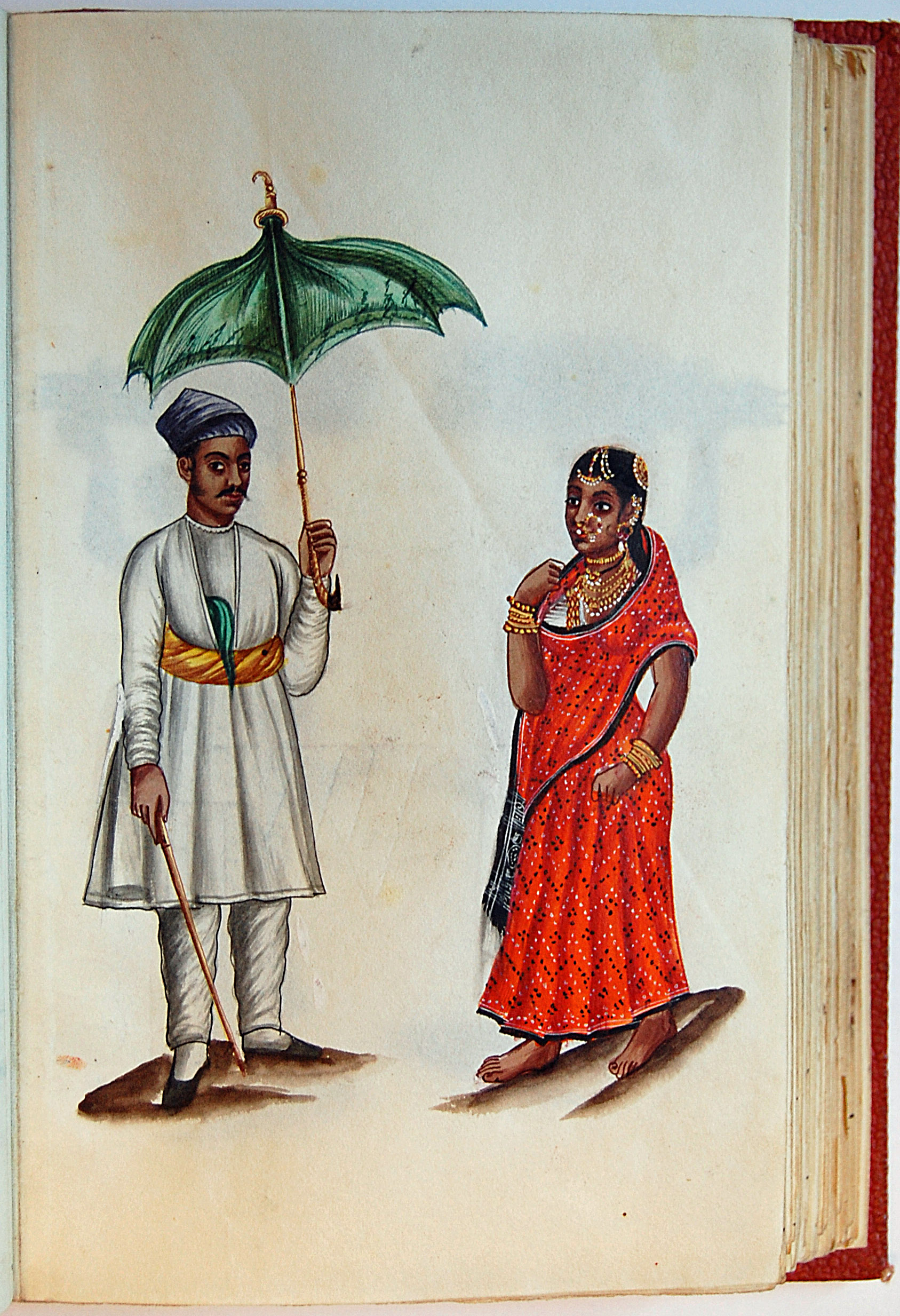
- Tamil Muslims of Madras presidency in 1830

Regions with significant populations
- Tamilnadu, Kerala, Karnataka, Maritime Southeast Asia, Arabian Peninsula, Western Europe, North America

Languages
- Tamil (Mother Tongue) • Malayalam

Religion
- Islam (Sect – Sunni, Madhab – Majority Hanafi)

Related ethnic groups
- Tamil People • Tamil Muslims • Dravidian

The Rowther (IPA: [(i)ra(ːʋ)ut̪ːɐr], also known as Irauttar, Rawther, Ravuttar, Ravutta, Ravuthar, Ravuthamar) are a distinct Muslim community living largely in the south Indian states of Tamil Nadu and Kerala. They are a native warrior clan population who converted to Islam under the influence of saints like Nathar Shah (Nathar Wali) in 10th–11th centuries. Even after conversion they retained their Ravuttar caste name. they were one of the earliest Muslim communities in India. They were elite cavalrymen of the Chola and Pandya kingdoms. They were traditionally a martial clan like the Maravars, and constitute large part of the multi-ethnic Tamil Muslim community. Rowthers have also been found as Tamil polygars, zamindars and chieftains from the 16th to 18th centuries. The traditional homelands of the Rowthers were in the interior of Southern Tamilakam.

== Etymology ==
The name Ravuttar (or Ravutta, Ravuthar, Rowther, Rawther) means king, horseman, or cavalry warrior in the Tamil language and is derived from the word Rājaputra, in the sense of 'prince', 'nobleman', or 'horseman'. D.C. Sircar points out that Ravutta or Rahutta, as a title, means a 'subordinate ruler'. Some scholars claim that the name comes from Rathore, a name common among the Muslim Rajputs of North India. Historically, they are parts of clans traditionally holding positions as rulers and military folk. 'Ravuta' means a high-ranking title King, lord, or feudatory ruling chief.

'Rahut' or 'rowt' means Warrior and 'raya' means captain. 'Rāvuttarayan' or 'Rāvuttakartan' means high military chief of cavalry.

== Demography ==
Rowthers are largest Muslim community in Tamil Nadu. they found all over Tamil Nadu and in Central and Southern Kerala. Their mother tongue is Tamil. Many of them are familiar with the Perso-Arabic script. They adhere to the principles of Islam, engaging in the study of the Quran and other religious texts in Arabic. Simultaneously, despite their commitment to their Islamic faith, they share a common pride with all Tamils in their rich Tamil language and vibrant cultural heritage.

== Culture ==
Rowthers generally speak Tamil.

They have their own distinct culinary traditions which notably include Rowther Biryani., which is made of Jeera Samba rice, and desserts like Dumroot, a cake-like dish made out of semolina. Mutton is the preferred meat for special occasions like wedding events, house warming ceremonies, etc.

Much like other Muslim communities, Drinking Culture is non-existent due to Islam's stance regarding consumption of alcohol. As is the consumption of pork and usage of products derived from pigs. Due to following Hanafi rulings, they also might abstain from consuming shellfish like prawns, shrimps, crabs, lobsters, etc.due to them being deemed Makruh in the Hanafi madhab.

The Elderly Men wear solid white Vēṭṭis (unstitched) or solid white Kayili (stitched) for formal occasions. For more informal settings, a colored and patterned (checkered or striped) kayili is worn, usually as loungewear, regardless of age group and social standings. Religious Clerics or men who might be devout in their beliefs wear a jubbah, often paired with a kayili. For special occasions, men might wear a waistcoat. Men usually get married wearing either a Western Suit or a Sherwani. They wear a white skullcap as headgear, especially if they are devout. Other headgear include the Turban and the Fez, which aren't worn as frequently as everyday headgear as how the white skullcap might be, usually reserved for special occasions.

Women's traditional attire is the sari, serving as a bridal wear and for other formal occasions. Elderly women usually wear the sari as an everyday attire, regardless of the occasion. Over the decades, both as formal and informal wear, as is the case with the rest of the Indian subcontinent, the Salwar Kameez has become more prevalent, especially among working women and among the younger generations. The older generations used to wrap around an unstitched and white over-sheet by the name of 'Thupathi' over their garments, as a marker of modesty and Purdah. However, due to evolving trends and cultural exchange, nowadays, as Purdah, women wear the Abaya, usually black in colour, paired with a headscarf.

Both men and women might dye their hair (and beard, in the case of men) with Henna, in compliance with a Prophetic tradition. Women also apply Henna as bridal makeup and for other special occasions. Applying Surma as an eyeliner is another Prophetic tradition, as it is also a local cultural practice, especially more prevalent among women. Men might refrain from wearing silk garments and gold accessories due to a religious dictate of gold and silk being discouraged for men.

The community also celebrates a festival called Chandanakudam every year.

== Titles/surname ==
'Ravuttar', 'Rawther', and 'Rowther' are common surnames among the group, but other titles often used are below:

- Sahib
- Khan
- Shah
- Pillai/Pillay/Thampi/Thambi (Travancore and Tamil Nadu)
- Ambalam and Vijayan (Ramnad Zamindhari Estate)
- Servai Servaikkarar (In 1730s, Ravuttan Servaikkarar (Rauten Cheerwegaren) was a high military ranked man in Ramnad Kingdom.)

== Identity and origins ==
Rowthers are Soldiers, officials, and literati attached to Muslim Court in the Deccan. In described as a Rāuta, Rāutta or Rāvutta derived from Sanskrit Rajaputra and was often assumed by subordinate rulers.

Later, Chola kings too invited Horse traders from the Seljuk Empire who belonged to the Hanafi school. During 8th-10th centuries, an armada of Turkish traders settled in Madurai, Tanjore, Tiruchirapalli, Tharangambadi, Nagapattinam, Muthupet, Koothanallur and Podakkudi.

These new settlements were now added to the Rowther community. There are some Anatolian and Safavid inscriptions found in a wide area from Tanjore to Thiruvarur and in many villages. These inscriptions are seized by the Madras Museum. Some Turkish inscriptions were also stolen from the Big Mosque of Koothanallur in 1850.

There are two factions of Rowthers in Tamil Nadu, Tamils cavalry warriors covers majority of Tamil Nadu while Seljuk Turkic clan remains in Delta districts and some south tamilnadu districts and Kerala. Both now Tamil and Turkish Hanafi expanded with population and some circumstantial evidence in historical sources that the Rowthers are related to Vellalar converts. Rowthers worked in the administration of the Vijayanagar Nayaks.

=== Social system: kinship ===
The Rowthers were an endogamous group. But like all modern societies, they have adapted to modern norms and rituals.

==== Kinship terms ====
English	Rowther's Tamil/Malayalam
Father	Aththaa or Atthaa/ Vappichi
Mother	Amma/Buva
Elder Brother	Annan
Younger Brother	Thambi
Elder Sister	Akka
Younger Sister	Thangai/Thangachi
Paternal Grandfather	Atthatha/Ayya/Appa/Radha
Paternal Grandmother	Aththamma/Radhima or Thathima
Maternal Grandfather	Ayya/Appa or Ammatha/Nanna
Maternal Grandmother	Mooma/Ammama/Nannimma
Father's Elder Brother/ Husband of Mother's Elder Sister	Periyatha or Periyavaapa
Mother's Elder Sister / Wife of Father's Elder Brother	Periyamma or Periyabuva
Father's Younger Brother	Chaacha/Chinnaththa
Mother's Younger Sister	Khalamma/Chinnamma/Chiththi
Maternal Uncle	Mama
Maternal Aunt	Maami
Cousins	Machan & Machi
Elder Brother's Wife	Madhini/Machi

== Rites and rituals ==
=== Marriage ===
Nevertheless, in cities, inter-marriages do occur, although they are rare" (Vines, 1973). cross-cousins are potential spouses. Remembering the community's historic valor, during marriage ceremonies, the bridegroom is conducted in a horseback procession.

=== Occupational activities ===
Traditionally the Rowthers were landlords and landowning community (historically mentioned as Rowthers were brave cavaliers and early Muslim horse-traders in Tamil literature), but today, they deal with various trade and occupations, mostly being self-employed. They deal in gemstones, gold, textiles, and real estate and participate in the food, beverage, and hospitality industry, construction work, and general merchandising. Some profess traditionally white-collar professions like doctors, engineers, advocates, civil servants, accountants, and teachers.

=== Administration and justice ===
There is traditional caste council or panchayat among the Rowthers. In Kerala Rawther Welfare Society (Rawther federation of India) and also Learned and Elderly individuals, and Religious Clerics act as advisors.

=== Religion ===
Rowthers belong to the Sunni sect of Islam and subscribe to the Hanafi school of jurisprudence. They follow the five basic tenets of Islam, which are:

1. Belief in the Shahadah,
2. Offering mandatory Prayers five times a day, at specific and prescribed time periods,
3. Observing fast during the month of Ramadan,
4. Giving charity (Zakah) to the poor, and
5. Going on the Hajj pilgrimage, once in a person's lifetime, if said person has the means to do so (financially, physically, or otherwise).

Their adherence to the Hanafi madhab

Being Hanafi adherents, Rowthers tend to subscribe to the Deobandi movement, which is a reformist movement that arose during the 19th century in North India. The aim of this movement is to eradicate religious innovations and other practices that the movement might deem 'heretical' or 'deviant', all of which might have crept within the subcontinent's Muslims and their practices over the centuries.

In contrast, they can also be part of the Barelvi movement (Sunnat Jamaath), which also began in North India during the late 19th century. The Barelvi movement emphasise more on retaining the centuries of religious traditions and practices, and encourages visiting the resting place (Dargahs) of Awliyas and seeking intercession.

The major festivals celebrated are Puthandu, Pongal, Eid-Ul-Fitr, Chandanakudam, and Bakr-id.

== Closeness in Tamil inscriptions and literature ==
The well-known legend of the Shiva saint Manikkavacakar of the 9th century is connected with the purchase of horses for the Pandya king. In that, the god Shiva who appeared in disguise as a horse trader to protect the saint and he is called as Rowther. Also, the Tamil god Murugan is praised by saint Arunagirinathar as சூர் கொன்ற ராவுத்தனே (Oh Ravuttan, who vanquished Sooran) and மாமயிலேரும் ராவுத்தனே (Oh Ravuttan, who rides on the great peacock) in his Kanthar Alangaram (கந்தர் அலங்காரம்) and in Kanthar Venba (கந்தர் வெண்பா).

This shows the religious harmony of Rowthers and Saivites in early Tamilakam till now.

There were Tamil Rowthers working in the administration of the Vijayanagara Empire in the Khurram Kunda. The inscription details the dedication of the land by the Rowther to a Murugan temple in Cheyyur.

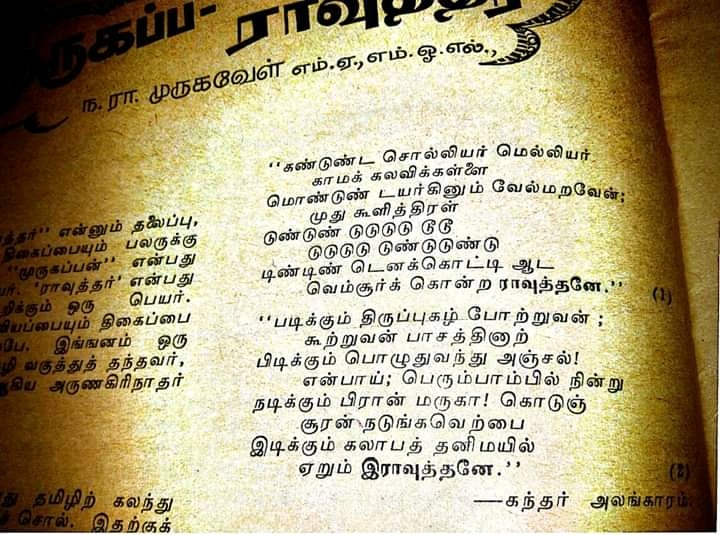
Arunagirinathar Tamil poet say Murugan as Ravuttar

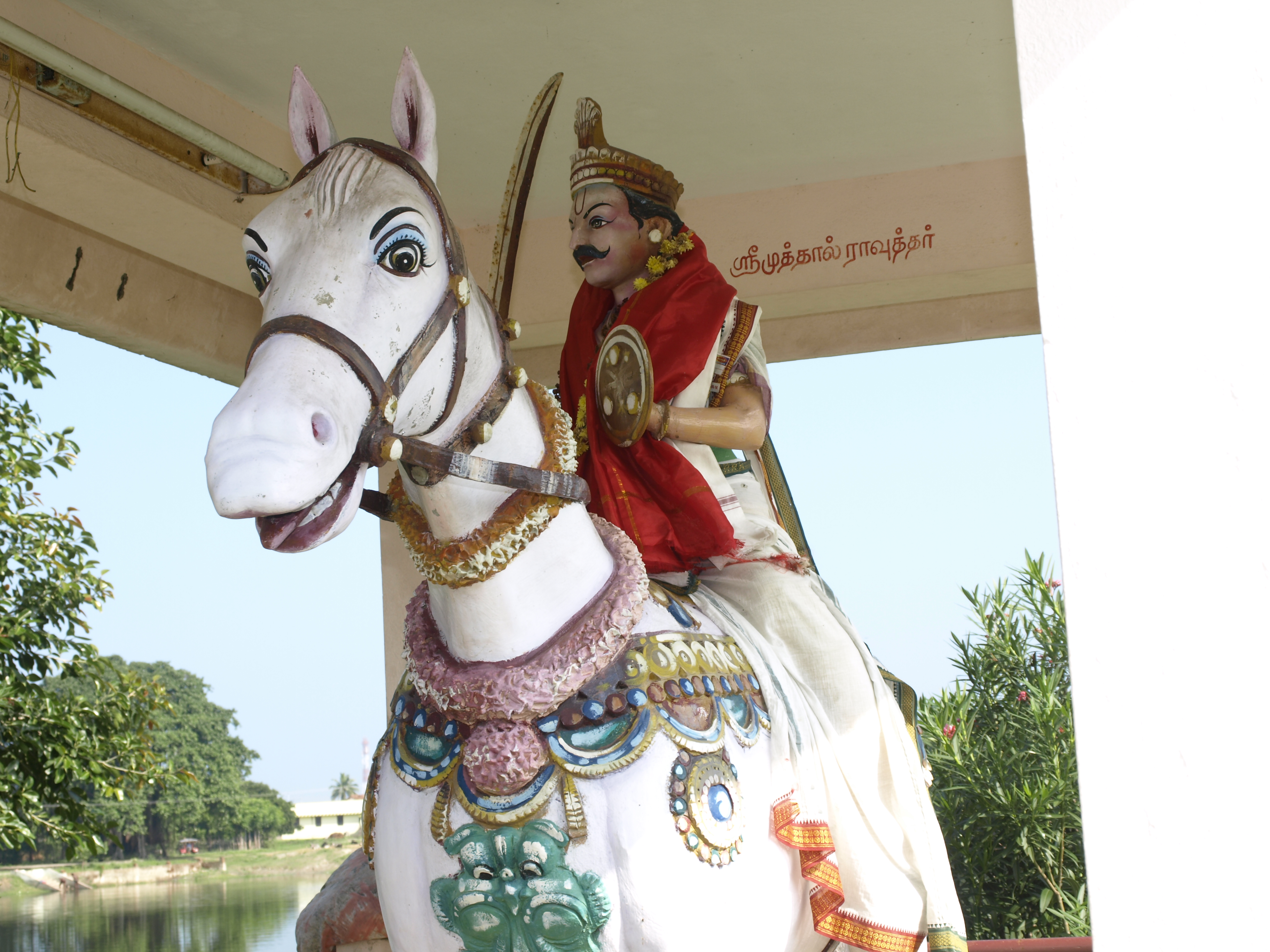
Muththal Ravuttar Deity

Muththaal Ravuttar (meaning Muslim Rowther is a Prakrit derivation from raja-putra) figures as Tamil male deities who protect Tamil land.

== Modernisation ==
Rowthers are one of the most prominent Muslim groups in South India, making their mark in various fields, from jurisprudence to Entertainment.

The community gives importance to education. Due to Globalization and the 1991 Economic Reforms, a lot of societal and cultural shifts have taken place. The aftermath has resulted in women being more active participants of the workforce and an increase in their participation in higher education and academia. Grants and scholarships have been established by numerous Muslim minority institutions to make education easier for women to seek and access. Thus, women today, are encouraged and emphasised to pursue and excel in secular education as much as it might be encouraged for them to excel in religious education.

Due to easier and better access to religious resources and more religious awareness, the community has also gradually begun to allow women to pray in masjids, particularly during the occasions of Jummah and Eid, and make them more active participants in masjid activities (hosting seminars, workshops, and classes). Historically, in the Indian subcontinent, due to societal and cultural reasons, more so than any religious mandate, women were discouraged to attend, pray, and participate in masjids.

== See also ==
- Tamil people
- Quaid-e-Millath
- Tamil Muslims
- Mukkulathor

== Bibliography ==
- J. P. Mulliner. Rise of Islam in India. University of Leeds chpt. 9. Page 215
- Hussein, Asiff (2007). Sarandib : an ethnological study of the Muslims of Sri Lanka (1st ed.). Nugegoda: Asiff Hussein. ISBN 978-955-97262-2-7. OCLC 132681713.
- Singh, K. S.; Thirumalai, R.; Manoharan, S., eds. (1997). People of India. Tamil Nadu. Madras: Affiliated East-West Press [for] Anthropological Survey of India. pp. 1259–1262. ISBN 81-85938-88-1. OCLC 48502905.
- Singh, K. S.; Madhava Menon, T.; Tyagi, D.; Kulirani, B. Francis, eds. (2002). Kerala. New Delhi: Affiliated East-West Press [for] Anthropological Survey of India. p. 1306. ISBN 81-85938-99-7. OCLC 50814919.
- Mines, Mattison. Social Stratification among the Muslim Tamils in Tamil Nadu, South India, Imtiaz Ahmad, ed, Caste, and Social Stratification among the Muslims, Manohar book service, New Delhi, 1973.
- Nanjundayya, H.V. and lyer, LK.A, 1931, The Mysore Tribes and Castes, IV, The Mysore University. Mysore.
- Thurston, E., Castes and Tribes of Southern India, Government Press, Madras, 1909.
