= Nadar estate =

Poraiyar Nadar's estate (Tamil: பொறையார் நாடார் எஸ்டேட்), popularly known as Nadar estate was one of the largest zamindari estate in the erstwhile Tanjore district of Madras Presidency, British India. Headquartered in the village of Poraiyar, Mayiladuthurai district (Previously Thanjavur district), Nadar's estate covered a total area of 7000 acres in the Cauvery delta region.

== History ==
The patriarch of the Nadar estate was Vellaiya Nadar, he was an abkari contractor, he established several distillery industries across South India, following Vellaiya Nadar, the Poraiyar Nadar estate remained as one of the biggest distillers of British India for more than a century.

Porayar Nadar estate's V. Thavasumuthu Nadar bought the Ariyalur Zamin in the court auction and became the Zamindar of Ariyalur. Poraiyar Nadar Estate has held the title of Zamindar of Ariyalur for half a century.

Thavasumuthu Nadar was a philanthropist, he desired to develop education in his rural area, established Thavasumuthu Nadar Higher Secondary School in 1882 in Poraiyar. He helped to construct the Raja Mirasdar Hospital in Thanjavur in 1878.

Nadar estate showed an active interest in the administrative affairs of Hindu temples, In 1889, V. Ponnusamy Nadar of Nadar estate was elected to the Kumbakonam Temple Committee, which administered Hindu temples in the taluks of Kumbakonam, Mayavaram and Shiyali.

The most well known among the Nadar estate was Rao Bahadur T. Rathinasamy Nadar, he established the first Sangam for the Nadar community, the Nadar Mahajana Sangam in 1910. During the Congress party's main agitational period, from inception in 1885 to early 1890s, T. Ratnaswami Nadar was one of its financiers.

T. Rathnaswamy Nadar also played a vital role in the development of Tranquebar region by bringing in the railway line for the town. To honor his services, the British Government conferred Rao Bahadur Award to him 1911.

In 1906, Nadar estate's T. Guruswami Nadar built the hostel building for Kumbakonam Arts and Science College and dedicated it to the memory of his father V. Thavsasmuthu Nadar and named the hostel as "Queen Victoria" to commemorate her Golden Jubilee.

T.V. Balagurusamy Nadar of Nadar estate was one of the founder-director of Tamilnad Mercantile Bank (then known as Nadars Bank ltd) in 1921.
