= Ukkadai estate =

Zamindari estate in Tamil Nadu, India

Ukkadai Estate is a zamindari estate in the Papanasam taluk of Thanjavur district in Tamil Nadu, India. It is administered by a family of the Kallar (Thevar) caste and covered more than 7,000 acres. The administrative headquarters was located at the village of Ukkadai.

== History ==
The first known zamindar of Ukkadai was Salya Thevar. The most popular among the zamindars was Venkatachala Thevar who was known for his loyalty and support to the India. In the eighteenth-century security of persons and property was endangered by men of the robin hood type, but this enterprising benefactor assisted the East India Company to bring these notorious characters within the grip of the law.

The East India Company sought the aid of Venkatchala Thevar, and the latter rendered willing service to the police in arresting the outlaw and in bringing him to justice. But, by the help of his gang, this desperado made his escape from goal, and the Government, Placing its trust in the ability of Venkatachala Thevar, specially deputed him to trace and arrest the runaway. This successfully accomplished, and the Government, recognizing the services of the captor, determined to offer him a valuable bracelet set with rubies and diamonds. His Excellency, Lord Elphinstone, the then Governor of Madras, in response to an invitation, visited the village of Ukkadai in 1840, and he not only formally presented Thevar with the bracelet from the East India Company, but on his own behalf handed to him another jewel of similar value.

These two emblems of honour are still preserved in the family and are worn on very important occasions.

Rao Bahadur Annasamy Thevar was known for his social activities. He helped construct a dispensary for outpatients at the Raja Mirasdar Hospital in Thanjavur in 1898. Thevar was awarded a Certificate of Merit during the Diamond Jubilee of Queen Victoria.

Appavoo Thevar, desired to develop education in his rural area. He started Ukkadai Appavoo Thevar Higher Secondary School in 1958.
