= Kunniyur =

- village
- Location in Tamil Nadu, India Kunniyur (India)
- Coordinates: 10.67°N 79.43°E
- Country: India
- State: Tamil Nadu
- District: Thiruvarur

Population (2001)
  - Total: 1,700

Languages
  - Official: Tamil
- Time zone: UTC+5:30 (IST)

Kunniyur is a village in Thiruvarur district in, Tamil Nadu, India. It is near the town of Mannargudi.

== Demographics ==
As per the 2001 census, Kunniyur had a population of 1700 with 864 males and 836 females.

== The Kunniyur estate ==
Kunniyur was home to a mirasdari which covered over 6,000 acres (24 km^{2}). The name Kunniyur has become famous because of the last Shri. Kunniyur Sambasiva Iyer.
