= Poondi estate =

Permanently settled zamindari estate in the Thanjavur district of Tamil Nadu, India

Poondi estate is a permanently settled zamindari estate in the Thanjavur district of Tamil Nadu, India. It is administered by the Vandayar family of the kallar caste.

== See also ==
- Rao Bahadur V. Appasamy Vandayar
- K. Thulasiah Vandayar
- A.V.V.M Sri Pushpam College
