= Nadar (disambiguation) =

Nadar is the pseudonym of Gaspard-Félix Tournachon (1820–1910), a French photographer, caricaturist, journalist, novelist, balloonist and proponent of heavier-than-air flight.

Nadar may also refer to:

== Places ==
- Nadar, Jaunpur, a village in Uttar Pradesh, India
- Nadar estate, a landholding estate in the Madras Presidency of British India
- Nădar, a village in Spinuș Commune, Bihor County, Romania

== People ==
- A. Chidambaranatha Nadar (fl. mid-20th century), Indian politician
- A. Y. Arulanandasamy Nadar (1897–1954), Indian politician and philanthropist
- A. Y. S. Parisutha Nadar (1909–1985), Indian politician
- Ayya Nadar (1905–1982), Indian entrepreneur
- K. Kamaraj Nadar (1903–1975), founder and leader of the Indian National Congress
- Kiran Nadar (born 1951), Indian art collector and philanthropist, wife of Shiv Nadar
- Kunjan Nadar (fl. 1951–1967), Indian politician and lawyer
- M. Mayandi Nadar (born 1947), Indian politician
- N. Sundaran Nadar (1931–2007), Indian politician,
- Neelalohithadasan Nadar (born 1947), Indian politician
- P. Thanulinga Nadar (1915–1988), Indian politician, freedom-fighter and activist
- Ponnusami Nadar (fl. 1957–1968), Indian freedom fighter and politician
- R. Ponnappan Nadar (1921–1976), Indian politician
- Roshni Nadar (born 1981 or 1982), Indian executive, daughter of Shiv Nadar
- S. S. Mani Nadar (died 2002), Indian politician
- Shanmuga Nadar (1903–1969), Indian entrepreneur
- Shiv Nadar (born 1945), Indian industrialist and philanthropist
- T. Rattinasami Nadar (fl. early-20th century), Indian founder of Nadar Mahajana Sangam
- T. V. Balagurusamy Nadar (fl. 1903–1921), Indian founder and director of Nadar Bank and president of Nadar Mahajana Sangam
- V. V. Ramasamy Nadar (fl. early-20th century), Indian politician and social activist
- W. P. A. Soundarapandian Nadar (1893–1953), Indian politician

== Other uses ==
- Nadar (caste), an Indian caste
- Prix Nadar, an award for a photography book edited in France, named after Tournachon

== See also ==
- Nader, a given name and surname
- Nador (disambiguation)
