= Nadar (caste) =

Caste in South India and Sri Lanka

Regions with significant populations
- Chennai, Kanyakumari, Kollam, Madurai, Thanjavur, Thiruvananthapuram, Thoothukudi, Tiruchendur, Tirunelveli, Virudhunagar, Tenkasi, Sivakasi, Rajapalayam, Sankarankovil, Nagercoil

Languages
- Tamil, Malayalam

Religion
- Hinduism, Christianity, Ayyavazhi

Related ethnic groups
- Tamil people

Nadar (also referred to as Nadan, Shanar and Shanan) is a Tamil caste of India. Nadars are predominant in the Tamil Nadu districts of Kanyakumari, Thoothukudi, Tirunelveli, Tenkasi and Virudhunagar.

The Nadar community was not a single caste, but developed from an assortment of related subcastes, which in course of time came under the single banner Nadar. Nadar climbers were the largest subsect of today's Nadar community. A few subsects of the Nadar community, such as the Nelamaikkarars, were traditionally wealthy landlords and money lenders. Historically, most Nadars were cultivators of palmyra trees and jaggery and a few were also involved in the toddy trade. Nadar climbers had faced discrimination from major upper castes in some regions. The martial art of Varma Kalai was historically practiced by the Nadars.

The socio-economic development achieved by the Nadars in southern India has elicited academic interest. Nadars are classified and listed as an Other Backward Class by the governments of both Tamil Nadu and India.

== Etymology ==
The community was previously known as Shanar but legally changed their name to Nadar in 1921. The title Nadar is believed to be derived from the Nelamaikkarars, the aristocrats of the Shanar community who had previously used it exclusively. Nadars claim that the original name of the community was Shantror or Shandrar (noble one) which, in course of time, was corrupted to Shanar. Channar is a title used by the Ezhava community of Kerala. However, there is no evidence to support these claims.

== History ==
The origin of Nadars as a social group is uncertain. Hardgrave stated that the Teri palmyra forests around today's Tiruchendur must have been their original abode. In the late 19th century, some Nadar activists started claiming that the Nadars are the descendants of those who ruled the Pandyan kingdom and that when Nayak rulers captured the Pandya country, it was divided into several Palayams (divisions) for each of which Palaiyakkars were appointed as rulers. They also claimed that the Nayak rulers of Tamil Nadu imposed Deshaprashtam (ostracism) on the ancient Nadars to ensure that they would not rise. According to Hardgrave these claims were not completely baseless. The traditions followed by the Nelamaikkarars and the existence of the ruins beneath the Teri palmrya forests of Tiruchendur and the Pandyan capital city of Korkai, where the Nadar population is predominant, suggest they could very well be the heirs of the Early Pandyas. However, there is little evidence to support the community's claim to be descendants of the later Pandya rulers. The identity or caste of the Pandyan kings remains a mystery. This belief, that the Nadars had been the kings of Tamil Nadu, became the dogma of the Nadar community in the 19th century. According to legendary accounts, some of the Nadars had migrated to Sri Lanka, but they had to return to India as they didn't receive proper treatment in Sri Lanka.

== Nadars of the 19th century ==
In the early nineteenth century, the Nadars were a community mostly engaged in the palmyra industry, including the production of toddy. However, there were a few subsects comprising wealthy landlords and money lenders. At this time, the majority of Nadars lived south of the Thamirabarani River, and formed 80 – 90 per cent of the population between there and Cape Comorin. Although numerically dominant in the area, the Nadars had a minimal interaction with other communities and they were themselves divided by their various endogamous subcastes, and thus lacked communal cohesion. While the majority of the Nadar population in the south of Thamirabarani river were poor, landless palmyra climbers, there also existed a small endogamous sub group of aristocratic Nadars, known as the Nelamaikarrars or Nadans, who owned vast tracts of land. These Nadans either held their position directly under Nayak rulers in the Tiruchendur area or as petty lords under the Palaiyakkarar. They commanded high respect among the population, including from groups such as the Nadar climbers, the minority Vellalars and the Brahmins. Nadan men rode horses and their women rode in covered palanquins.

Nadar climbers were also to be found in other regions of Tamil Nadu where a few palmyra trees grew. In areas where the Nadar climber population consisted of only a few families in a village, they faced discrimination from major upper castes. Due to their association with toddy, the Nadars were considered lower than other middle castes, but relatively higher than the low castes, and were also prohibited to enter temples built by higher ranked castes. Although associated with toddy, the Nadars did not themselves consume it. The Nadars were schismatic about their position in the caste hierarchy and firmly claimed that they were wrongly placed in the caste system due to the Nayak invasion. They were also very caste conscious.

=== Nadars of Travancore ===
Hardgrave conjectures that the Nadars of Southern Travancore migrated there from Tirunelveli in the 16th century after the invasion of Tirunelveli by the Raja of Travancore. Like their Tirunelveli counterparts, the Nadars of Travancore were mostly palmyra climbers. However, a significant number of Nadars were subtenants to Nair or Vellalar landlords. These aristocratic Nadars called themselves Nadans and some of them had direct control over their lands. The Nadans enjoyed special privileges under the Raja and claimed that they were superior to the climbers. The climbers of Travancore fared a little better than their Tirunelveli counterparts but suffered severe social disabilities not found in Tirunelveli due to Travancore's rigid caste hierarchy. As Swami Vivekananda stated, the Keralite hierarchy was a lunatic asylum of castes. One example of the social disabilities was that Nadar climber women were not allowed to cover their bosoms to punctuate their low status. However, the Nadan women of the region were exempted from this restriction.

Discontented with their social status, a large number of Nadar climbers embraced Christianity and became upwardly mobile. Although they improved their status with the aid of Christian missionaries, the outcome of their conversion did not conform to the intent of those missionaries. Both the Christian and Hindu Nadar climber women wore the upper jacket in the manner of upper-class women, in order to improve their social status. In turn, upper-class men abused and discriminated against them. One Nadan family of Agastheeswaram, instead of supporting their depressed counterparts, supported the upper-class men and claimed that only their women had the right to wear an upper cloth. The situation became known as the Upper cloth controversy and became violent. Eventually, with assistance from the Travancore authorities, British Christian Missionaries and Vaikunta Swamy, the depressed Nadar climber women won the right to wear their upper cloth in the manner of their Nadan counterparts.

=== Northern Nadars ===
Some petty Nadar traders migrated from southern Tirunelveli to northern Tirunelveli and Virudhunagar. Over time they became commercially skilled and by the late 19th century were socially aspirant. Mercantilism played a crucial role in facilitating their upward mobility but religion was also perceived as a vehicle. Around 10 percent of the community converted to Christianity, both Catholic and Protestant.

British rule in the southern districts introduced new opportunities for trade and commerce, of which the Nadars took advantage. They established sophisticated pettais (fortified compounds) and urvinmurais (local caste associations) to ensure safety for their goods. Members of the uravinmurai, who were known as muraikkarars, would contribute a portion of their income to the association as mahimai (literally, to glorify oneself), in order to use the facilities of the pettais and to improve the common good. As the wealth of the Northern Nadars increased they began also to adopt the customs of the North Indian Kshatriyas in order to improve their social status, in a process now known as Sanskritisation. Many tried to disassociate themselves from their Nadar climber counterparts and the term Shanar (the term generally used to call a Tamil palmrya climber). They adopted the title of Nadan, previously used only by the Nelamaikkarars. To demonstrate their wealthy and powerful social position, the Nadars of Sivakasi hired Maravar palanquin bearers.

The upward mobility and kshatriya pretensions of the Nadars of the six towns of Ramanad caused resentment among both the Vellalar and the Maravar castes, who were ritually ranked above the Nadars. The outcome was a series of caste conflicts, including the Sivakasi riots of 1899. However, the Sankritisation movement was a failure initially and the Nadar climbers, who lived as minorities, were still discriminated by the majority castes. However these confrontations aided the community to protest for the required rights and privileges, with integrity, and also test how much other communities were willing to accept the Nadar claims of high status. The Northern Nadar leaders then sought to unite their community by encouraging intermarriages within the five major Nadar subcastes and also uplift the depressed palmrya Nadar climbers. They also sought to maintain amiable relationships with other communities. This led to the formation of the Nadar Mahajana Sangam in 1910.

=== Sri Lanka ===
Some Nadars emigrated from South India to Sri Lanka during the British colonial era.

== Nadars of the 20th century ==
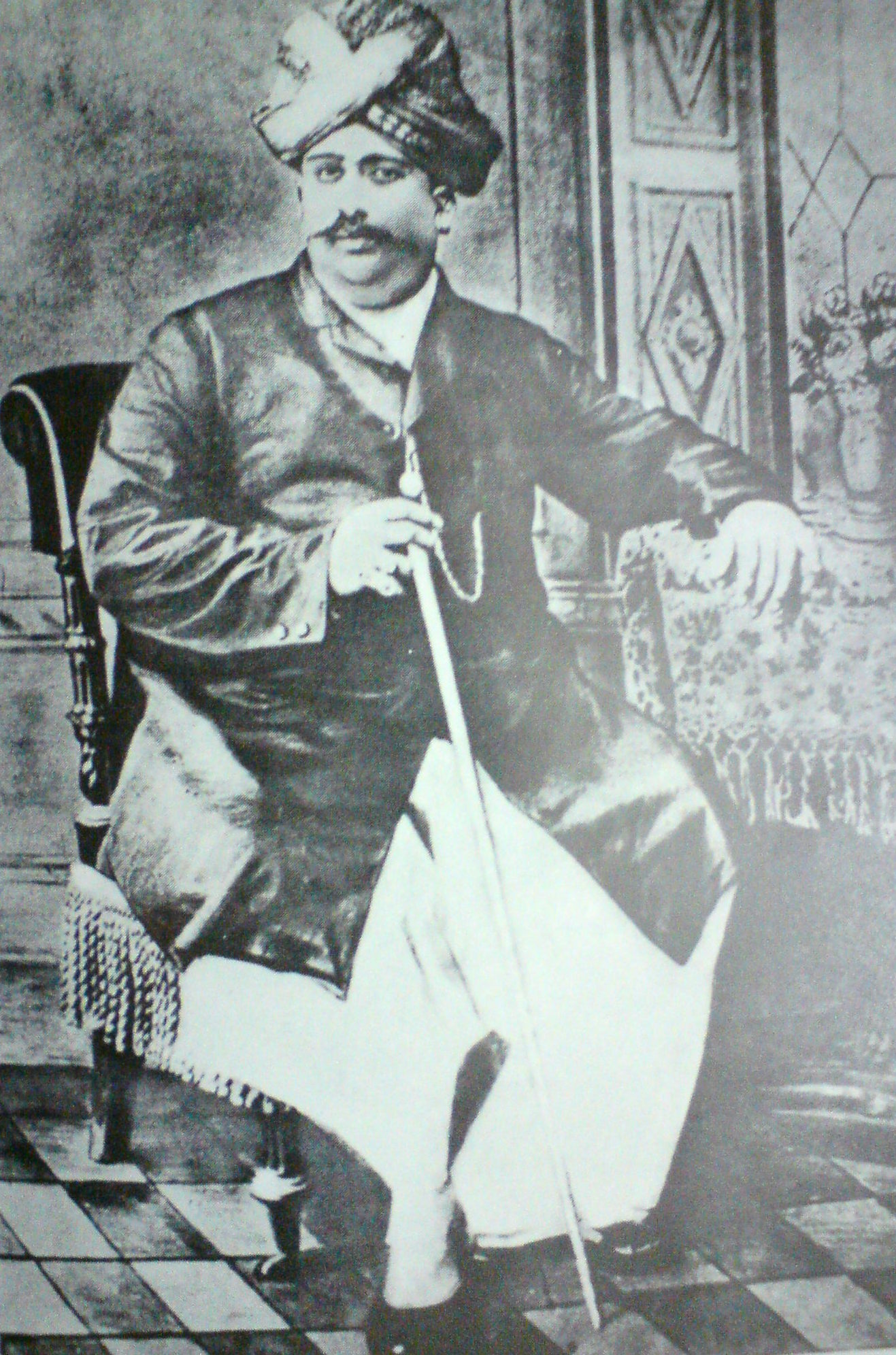
Rao Bahadur T. Rattinasami Nadar, founder of the Nadar Mahajana Sangam

=== Nadar Mahajana Sangam ===
The separate Nadar associations of the six Ramanad towns were unable to support a community that was becoming more dispersed as many began to migrate to other parts of Madras Presidency. With the rise of the politically ambitious T. Rattinasami Nadar, a wealthy Nadar of Porayar in Thanjavur district, a new association was formed. This resulted from Rattinasami Nadar inviting prominent community leaders to attend a plenary session in February 1910, with the intent of establishing an organization to represent the entire community. Rattinasami Nadar's uncle, V. Ponnusami Nadar, was elected to become the first president of the association, which was called the Nadar Mahajana Sangam. The association was open to any Nadar male of any subcaste or religion, and had as its general purpose the upliftment of the community. The early Sangam conferences were dominated by the Northern Nadars.

=== Against toddy ===
The campaign against toddy was one of the first steps taken by the Nadar Mahajana Sangam to enhance the social advancement of the entire Nadar community. Though majority of the Nadar climbers were engaged in the production of jaggery, a significant number of Nadar climbers were also involved in the production of toddy. The Sangam urged the Nadar climbers to abandon their traditional occupation of toddy tapping and not to sell hard toddy. However many Nadar climbers were reluctant to give up their profitable occupation. The situation got out of hand when Nadar leaders tried to intimidate the climbers, by using tenets of their cult, to give up their occupation as toddy tappers. To ease the situation the district magistrate issued a proclamation restricting the climbers to sell hard toddy only in specific regions, where toddy can be legally drawn. However the Sangam's campaign was effective for only about a year.

=== Prohibition of toddy act ===
The Sangam then in order to aid the climbers, sought to abolish the tax levied on palmyra trees. After the establishment of the Prohibition (of toddy) act in the Northern districts of Madras Presidency, the Nadar Mahajana Sangam along with its sister association, Dakshina Mara Nadar Sangam of Tirunelveli, sought to remove it to aid the depressed climbers. The British advisor government in turn suspended the act. However, the prohibition act was reintroduced after the independence. Under the rules of the act, the climbers could only tap between 4 am to 2pm and sell sweet toddy between 6am and 2pm. These procedures can also only be practiced by climbers who have license. The rigid government rules pressurized the depressed climbers. The two prominent Nadars Sangams constantly pressurized the government and eventually the enforcement of these regulations gradually eased. By the mid-1950s, the government assigned cooperative societies to promote jaggery production.

=== Nadar educational institutions ===
The Nadar community did not completely rely on the Backward Class Commission for educational advancement. In 1885, the Northern Nadars established the Kshatriya Vidhyasala High School in Virudhunagar by using the mahimai funds from the Nadar uravinmurai. Education was also the primary concern of the Nadar Mahajana Sangam from inception. In 1921, the Sangam began to provide scholarship loans to needy students, and by 1964 more than 3000 such loans were offered. Some students were given assistance for foreign studies. The Sangam also aided the establishment of village schools. Education formed the largest portion of expenditure by the Nadar Mahajana Sangam. The Nadar bank along with other cooperative societies gave 5 percent of their profit to the scholarship fund. The Nadar Mahajana Sangam also established a college, Senthilkumara Nadar College, in 1947.

=== Resolution of inter-caste conflicts ===
In villages where there were few Nadar climbers, they were oppressed by those in the majority. The Nadar Mahajana Sangam acted in the interests of such climbers, using the strength and influence of the community at large. The climbers could ask the Sangam to intervene in inter-community issues, which would cause the Sangam to investigate the situation and determine the validity of any Nadar claims. Then, if necessary, the Sangam would request police intervention or support a claim in court. In situations where the matter went to court, the Sangam would not provide financial support for the Nadar claimant to contest the case, but would rather see that the claim is properly heard. After independence of India, the Sangam took advantage of the constitutional provisions encouraging a caste-less society and also supported government attempts to promote this vision. The support included urging their own community members to allow use of their schools, tanks, temples and wells by other communities. The name of the Nadar bank was changed to Tamilnad Mercantile Bank. These activities earned the Nadar community respect and recognition.

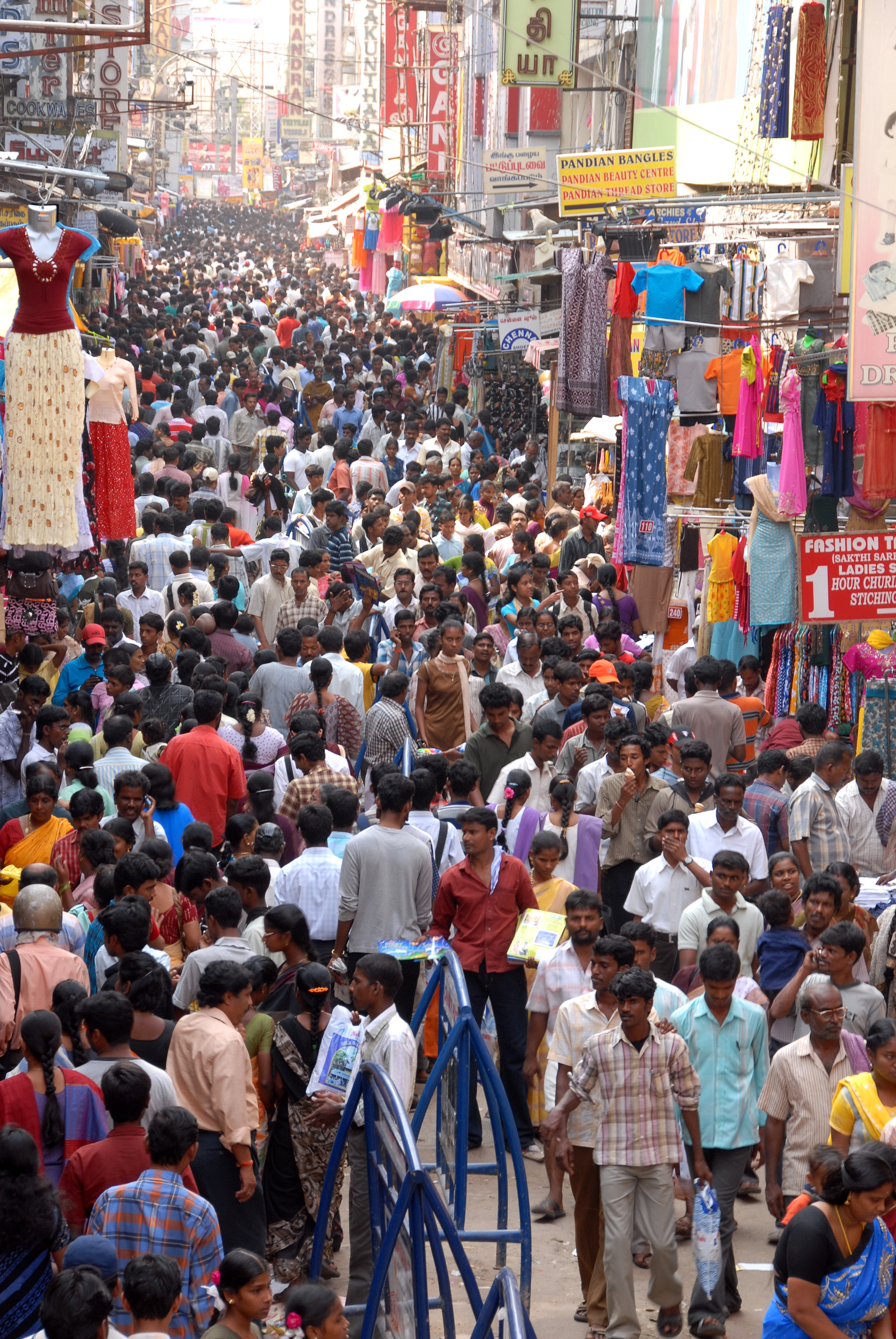
Most of the shops in Ranganathan Street, Tamil Nadu's premier high street, are owned by the Nadars.

== Politics ==
In the 1920s and 1930s, Nadar Mahajan Sangam supported the non-Brahmin movement and Justice party. W. P. A. Soundrapandian Nadar as the president of Nadar Mahajana Sangam led the effort to ally the community with Periyar E. V. Ramasamy's Self-respect movement. The Northern Nadars joined the Justice party in its attack against Brahmins on cultural and religious front. They also practiced self-respect marriages during the non-Brahmin movement.

However, in the late 1940s the Nadars' support shifted to Indian National Congress, in part because of the political success of K. Kamaraj, whose opinions had originally been disliked by his own community. After the end of Kamaraj's era, the Nadars' political support has become diffused across various parties and the Nadar Sangam has become less politicized.

== Nadars today ==
The social and economical development achieved by the Nadars have evoked academic interest. According to N.S.Ramnath, of Forbes, the Nadars are a close knit, powerful community. The Nadars, who were once predominantly not allowed to enter Hindu temples built by castes above them, now occupy respected positions as Trustees in many Hindu temples of Tamil Nadu. They are financially strong and are politically influential in the Southern districts of Tamil Nadu. A political observer points out that there is a Nadar leader in almost every political party. The community has influential Tamil media houses, such as Dina Thanthi. Crawford Young has said that:

Today, the Nadars are recognized as an "advanced" community – a status reversal accomplished over the past century through caste horizontal mobilization of caste solidarity, challenge to servile traditional ascription through ritual transformations, effective utilization of modern opportunity through education and commerce, and skilful communal exploitation of the political arena.

=== Government classification ===
Nadars are classified and listed as a Backward Class by the governments of both Tamil Nadu and India.

== Subcastes ==
The legend of the origin of the Nadars tell of the birth of seven sons; with the death of two, the remaining five father the separate divisions of the community. There were five major divisions among the Nadars. The Nadar community was not a single caste, but developed from an assortment of related subcastes and classes of different origins, which in course of time, came under the single banner Nadar. Nadar climber was the largest subsect of today's Nadar community. Nadars are predominant in the south Indian districts of Tuticorin, Kaniyakumari, Tirunelveli and Virudhunagar.

=== Karukkupattaiyathar ===
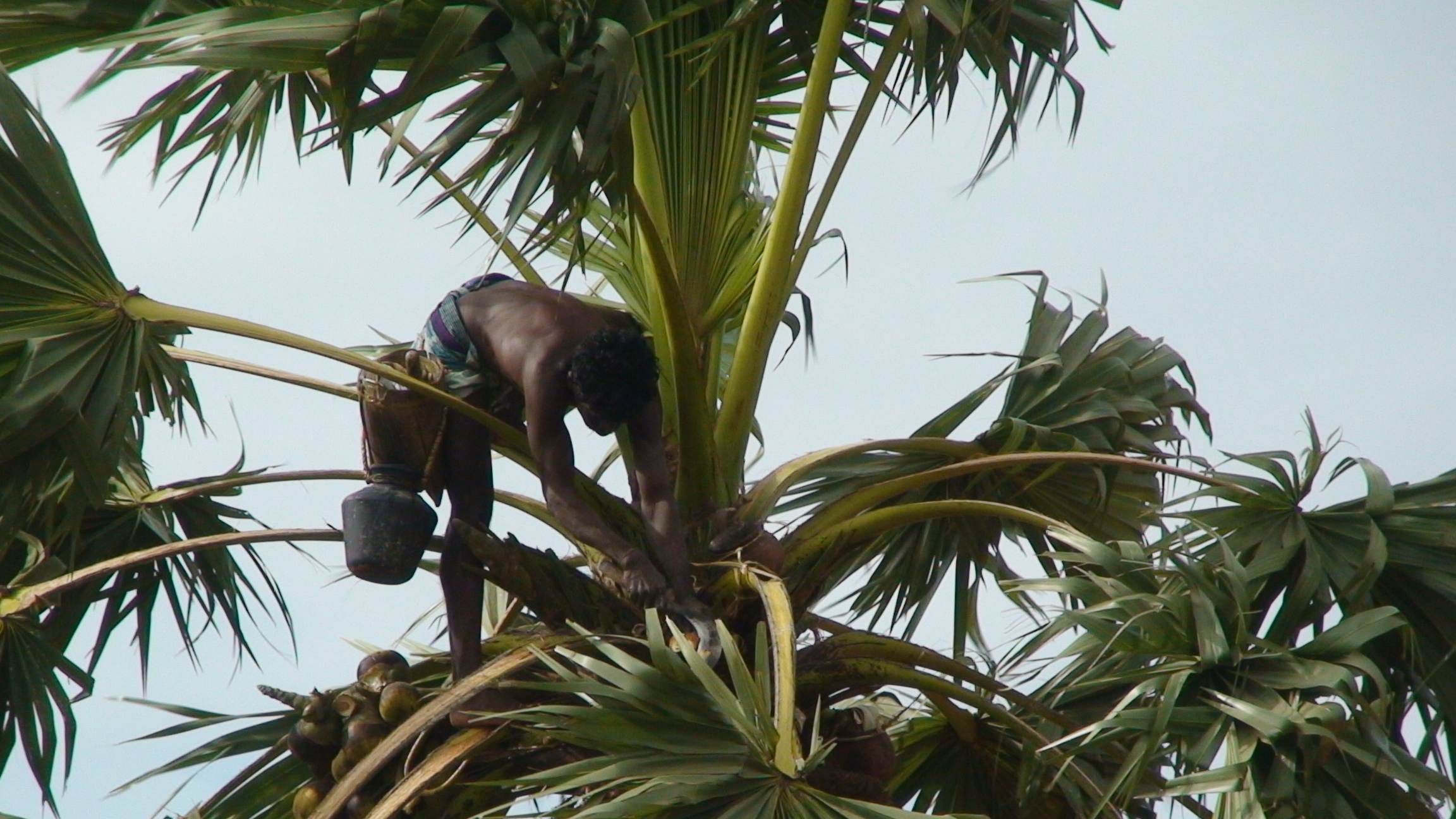
Palmrya climber in Tirunelveli district, Tamil Nadu

The Karukkupattaiyathar are supposed to be the original inhabitants of the country around Manadu. This sub-division was later known as Mara Nadar. They claim to be the descendants of the Pandyans. It is the largest of the five subcastes and constitutes about 80 percent of the entire community, including the aristocratic Nelamaikkarars and the climbers beneath them. The Nelamaikarrars and the climbers are endogamous groups, forming sub-subcastes that each marry only among themselves.

=== Mel-nattar ===
The term Mel-nattar comes from Mel-nadu (western country). Mel-nattars lived traditionally in the Southern Travancore and Western Tirunelveli districts. They claim to be descendants of the Chera kings who settled in the area of the Western Ghats after the fall of their dynasty.

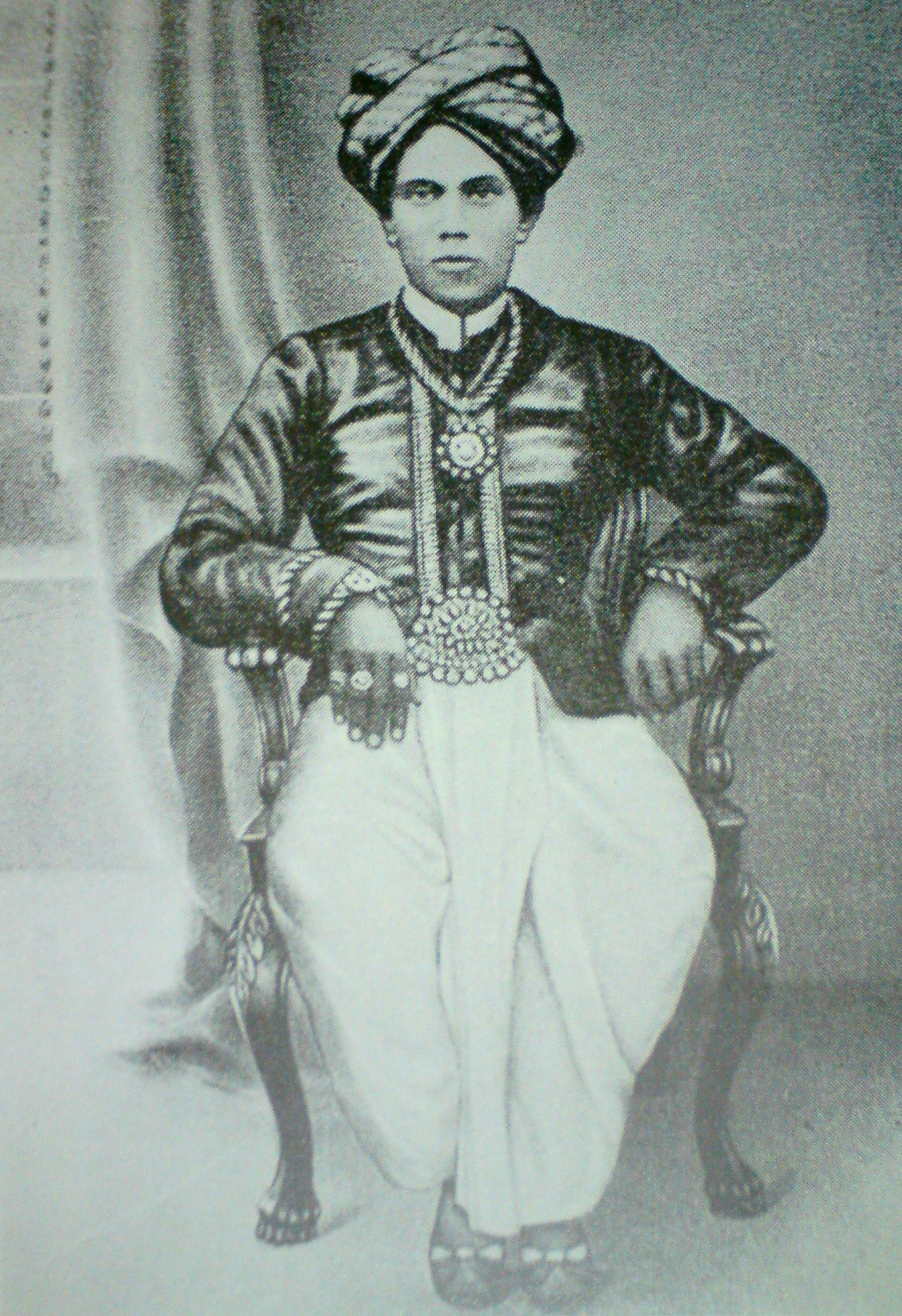
Tiruvarudi Vaihunda Nadan, the last Zamindar of Nattathi.

=== Nattathi ===
At the time that Robert Hardgrave conducted his study, in the 1960s, the Nattathis were predominant in the village of Nattathi near Sawyerpuram, Tuticorin district. There they were traditionally cultivators, traders and money lenders. Legendary accounts claim that the Nattathis are descendants born of the Pandyas and Cholas. The community was mostly Christian and remained an endogamous unit. The overlord of Nattathi was a retainer of the Kattabomma Nayaka. The Nattathi overlord was invested with Zamindari rights under the British. The last of the Nattathi zamindars, Tiruvarudi Vaihunda Nadan, died in 1892. The properties of the Zamindar were eventually divided among a number of claimants.

=== Kodikal ===
They are traditionally palmrya climbers. They are supposed to have migrated to the Pandyan country from the banks of the Cauvery River in Tanjore to serve the Pandyan kings as their flag bearers.

=== Kalla ===
The Kalla Shanars were considered as the lowest division of the Nadar community. They are also known as Servai. The term kalla means "false". They are believed originally to have been palanquin bearers for the Pandyan kings or menial slaves of the Nelamaikkarar family, having descended from illegal unions within the Nadar community. They are traditionally toddy tappers.

The subsect culture is not present today among the Nadars north of Tirunelveli but it still exists among those of southern Tirunelveli. The Karkuppatayathars, the endogamaous Nelamaikkarars and the Nadar climbers beneath them, are today known as A group or Mara Nadar, and the remaining four subcastes are known as B group.

=== Christian Nadars ===
In 1680, the first congregation of Nadars was started at Vaddakankulam with the conversion of Nadar women and a church was built accordingly in 1685. A permanent mission was established in 1701. Some Nadars accepted Christianity through will and some accepted it due to their aversion to local beliefs. In 1970, Christian Nadars numbered 150,000 as opposed to 1.5 to 2 million Hindu Nadars in Madras state. Nadar Christians, like Hindus, marry within their caste.

== Religious customs ==
The Hindu Nadars, like other Hindus, have a variety of religious rituals and ceremonies. These include procedures relating to birth, adulthood, marriage and death. Every Hindu Nadar belongs to a kuttam (assemblage) through patrilineal descent, and each kuttam has a common family deity. During migration, families would often take soil from their family temple and enshrine it at their new home. Traditionally, all the members of a kuttam would assemble at least once a year at the family temple. With the birth of a child, the family would traditionally go to the family deity temple, where the hair of the child is shaved for the first time and offered to the deity. At the time of marriage the first invitation is presented to the family deity.

The Hindu Nadars are almost entirely Saivite (only one kuttam is Vaishnavite). Of the deities, Murugan has been widely popular among the Nadars. Goddess Bhadrakali is the tutelary deity of the Nadar community. The Nadars also claim that they are the descendants of Bhadrakali. A Bhadrakali temple is usually at the centre of almost every Nadar settlement.

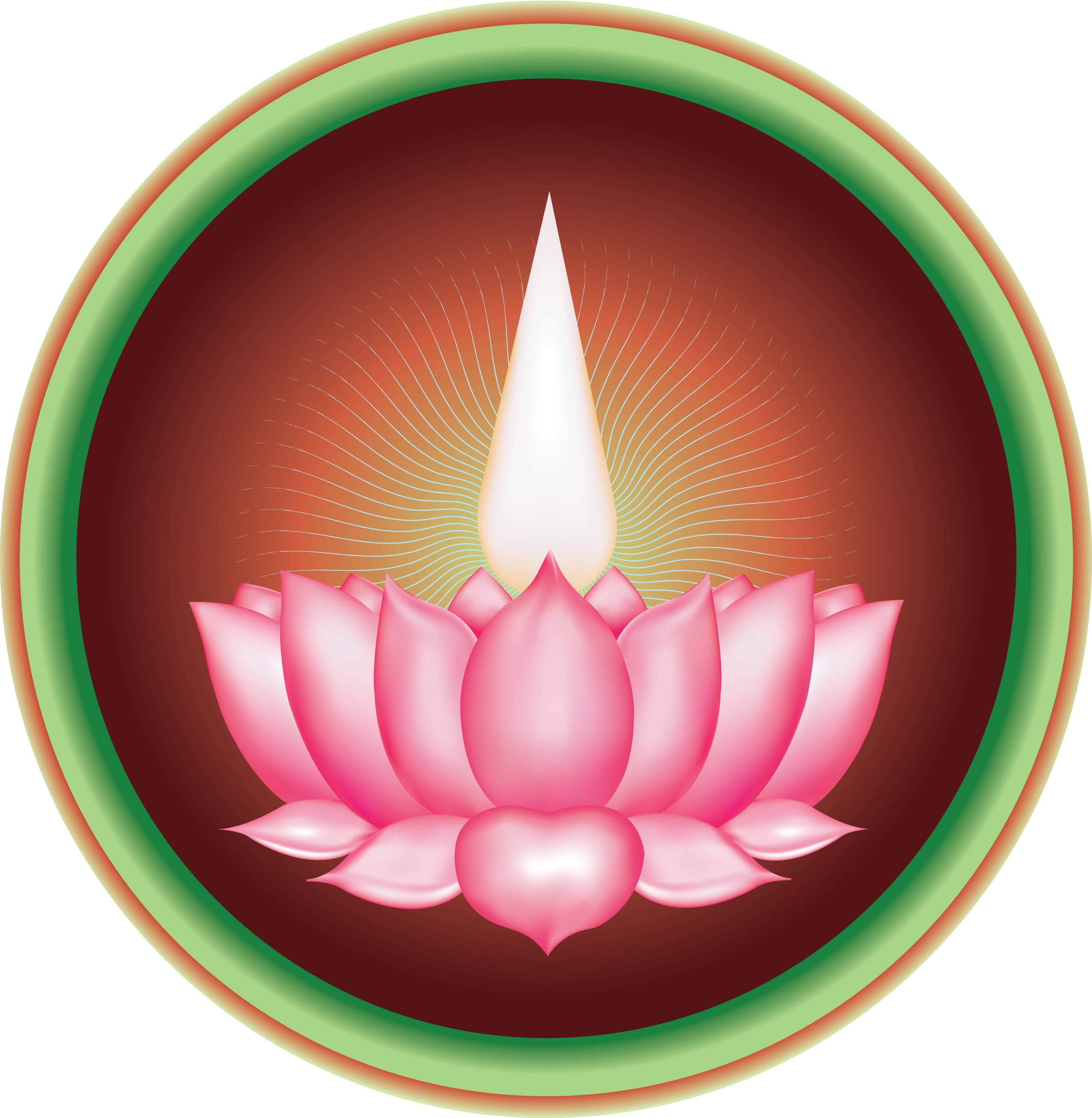
The socio-religious movement of Ayyavazhi was pioneered and patronized by the Nadar community.

== Martial arts ==
The Nadars, traditionally practised a Tamil martial art variously known as Adimurai, chinna adi and varma adi. In recent years, since 1958, these have been referred to as Southern-style Kalaripayattu, although they are distinct from the ancient martial art of Kalaripayattu itself that was historically the style found in Kerala.

== Some Notable Nadars ==
- K. Kamaraj, Former Chief Minister of Tamil Nadu
- Tamilisai Soundararajan, Governor of Telangana and Lieutenant Governor of Puducherry
- H. Vasanthakumar, Former Member of Parliament of the Republic of India and Founder of Vasanth & Co
- Marshal Nesamony, politician
- Shiv Nadar, Founder of HCL Technologies and Sri Sivasubramaniya Nadar College of Engineering
- V. Radhika Selvi, Former Minister of State for Home Affairs of the Republic of India.
- V. V. Ramasamy Nadar, Self Respect movement
- Vijayakumar (Alias) Vijay Vasanth, Indian actor and Member of Parliament of the Republic of India.
