= Durai Krishnamurthy =

Indian politician

Durai Krishnamurthy துரை கிருஷ்ணமூர்த்தி

Member, Tamil Nadu Legislative Assembly
- In office 1985–1989
- Preceded by: S. Natarajan
- Succeeded by: S. N. M. Ubayadullah
- Constituency: Thanjavur

Personal details
- Born: 4 November 1954 Thanjavur
- Party: Indian National Congress
- Profession: Agriculturist

Durai Krishnamurthy is an Indian politician and former member of the Tamil Nadu Legislative Assembly. Hailing from Keezhavasal in the Thanjavur district, Krishnamurthy completed his school education at Thanjavur. A member of the Indian National Congress party, he was elected to the Legislative Assembly in the 1984 Tamil Nadu state elections, representing the Thanjavur Assembly constituency.

== Electoral performance ==
=== 1984 ===
1984 Tamil Nadu Legislative Assembly election: Thanjavur
Party	Candidate	Votes	%	±%
INC	Durai Krishnamurthy	48,065	49.90%	New
DMK	P. S. Thangamuthu Nattar	46,304	48.08%	−2.53
INC(J)	M. K. Gadhadaran	1,327	1.38%	New
Independent	T. A. Bakthavachalam	618	0.64%	New
Margin of victory		1,761	1.83%	0.62%
Turnout		96,314	72.78%	9.20%
Registered electors		135,351		
INC gain from DMK		Swing	-0.70%	
