= A. Y. S. Parisutha Nadar =

Indian politician

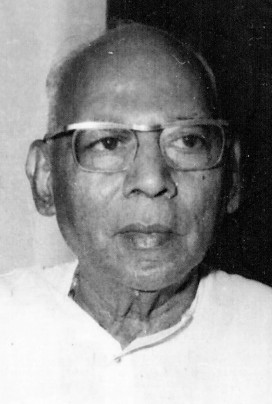

Municipal Chairman of Thanjavur
- In office 1959–1961

Member of Madras Legislative Assembly
- In office 1967–1971
- Preceded by: M. Karunanidhi
- Succeeded by: S. Natarajan
- Constituency: Thanjavur
- In office 1957–1962
- Preceded by: M Marimuthu, S. Ramalingam
- Succeeded by: M. Karunanidhi
- Constituency: Thanjavur

Member of Madras Legislative Assembly
- In office 1946–1952
- Succeeded by: Constituency abolished
- Constituency: Thanjavur, Madurai and Ramanathapuram Christian constituency

Personal details
- Born: 13 April 1909 Thanjavur, Madras Presidency, India
- Died: 14 May 1985 (aged 76) Thanjavur, Tamil Nadu, India
- Spouse: Philomena Soosaiammal

A. Y. S. Parisutha Nadar was an Indian politician. He was a member of the legislative assembly elected to Madras State from Thanjavur constituency as a Congress candidate. He was elected thrice from the constituency, in 1946, 1957 and 1967.

The people of Thanjavur, in his time, relied heavily on agriculture. There was a lack of industries and higher educational institutions. Parisutha Nadar, aided by Kamaraj was instrumental in facilitating the creation of institution of Thanjavur Medical College.

== Early life and education ==
He was born in Thanjavur, on 13 April 1909, to Yagappa Nadar and Gnanammal. His elder brother was Arulanandasamy Nadar. He did his schooling at St. Antony's High School, Thanjavur. He completed his intermediate course and graduated from St. Joseph's College in Tiruchirappalli. He was equally fond of sports and excelled in them.

== Political work ==
He was also elected as a Member of the Legislative Assembly (MLA) in 1946. During this tenure, he was a member of the Constituent Assembly, which helped draft the Constitution of India. He was part of the transient assembly and legislature formed just before India attained its independence. Parisutha Nadar and Jerome D'Souza were part of the commission that was specially formed for "the protection of Minorities' rights" under the Indian Constitution.

Political Roles
Role	Duration
1946-52	MLA, Thanjavur
1957-62	MLA, Thanjavur
1967-71	MLA, Thanjavur
1959-61	Municipal Chairman, Thanjavur

As MLA for Thanjavur, he completed a project to provide drinking water to Thanjavur from Kollidam. Thanjavur's Bus Stand, now referred to as the Old Bus Stand, was also instituted during his term in office. A bicycle manufacturing plant was also begun on his initiative. This was part of his vision towards providing industrial infrastructure and colleges of higher education.

A.Y.S. Parisutha Nadar was the MLA in Tamil Nadu, India for 3 terms, spanning over 15 years. He lost only once contesting against the Dravida Munnetra Kazhagam leader M Karunanidhi on a difference of about 1000 votes. He also served as the Municipal Chairman of Thanjavur apart from his dedication to the Indian National Congress. He had avery close association with Kamaraj and Kakkan.

== Achievements ==
- He represented the Madras Presidency in Football.
- He was the runner-up in Madras Presidency Billiards tournament.
- He became a pilot at the age of 61 when he successfully flew a solo flight.
- He was the founder president of the "Rotary Club of Thanjavur" in the year 1949.
- He was the founder president of The Thanjavur Cricket Club and Thanjavur District Football Association.
- During World War II, he served as the Air Raid Warden for Thanjavur and was decorated with the title "Rao Sahib" for his meritorious service to society.

== Philanthropic services ==
Parisutha Nadar was among the main donors of lands of about 150 acres (0.61 km^{2}) now occupied by the Thanjavur Medical College, the New Bus Stand and the Rajah Serfoji Government College.

== Agriculturist ==
Being a traditional agriculturist, he owned large tracts of agricultural lands cultivating paddy, banana, sugarcane and coconut. He was the first to introduce borewells in the region for irrigation. He was the first in the region to introduce mechanized systems in agriculture in the region.
