= Nadar climber =

Sub-caste in South India

Nadar climbers, or Pannayeri Nadars, are a sub-caste of today's Nadar community. They were regarded as the largest Nadar sub-caste. Their traditional occupation was climbing trees and gathering the sap of coconuts to make palm wine. Due to new economic opportunities, the majority of Nadar climbers have given up their traditional occupation.

== In the 19th century ==
=== Nadar climbers of Southern Tirunelveli ===
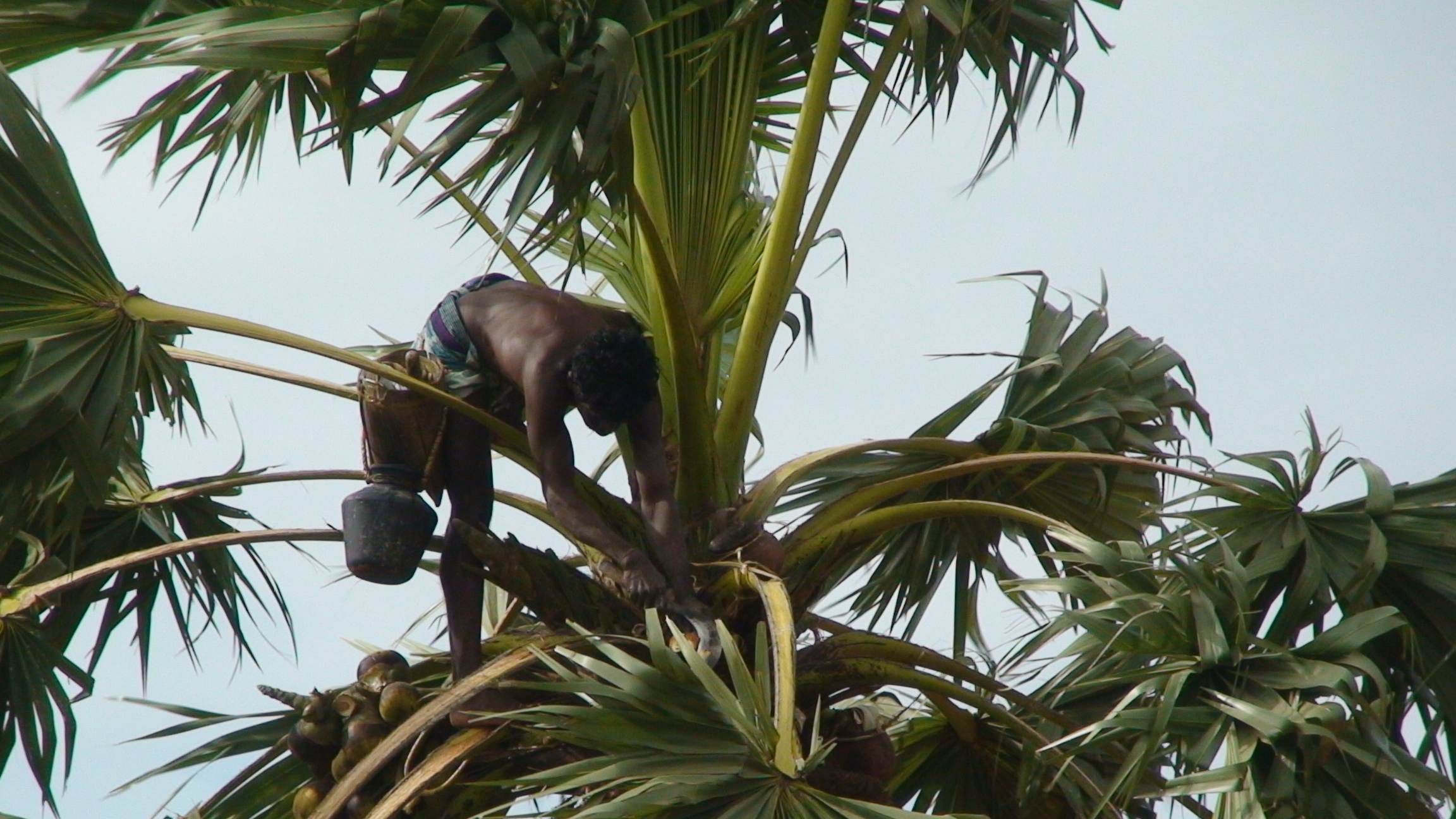
Nadar climber in Tirunelveli district in Tamil Nadu

To the south of the Tambraparni, the Nadar climbers constituted the vast majority of the population in the palmyra forests of the Tiruchendur teris, during the 19th century. Majority of the Nadars today come from the south of Thamiraparani river. The Nadar climbers here secured a meager living from the palmyra forests of Teri. The trees and land were owned by the Nelamaikkarars, a Nadar sub-caste. Each climber, like their northern Tirunelveli counterparts, was bound to a tree traditionally. Unlike their Northern Tirunelveli counterparts, the Nadar climbers didn't suffer social disabilities as they were the most predominant caste in the regions south of Tamirabarani. Under the Nawab and earlier British, the trees assessed separately from the land, and in these southern districts alone the palmryas were taxed.

=== Nadar Climbers of Northern Tirunelveli & Ramanad ===
In these areas, where the Nadar climbers usually numbered no more than a few families in a single village, and suffered social disabilities. These climbers were considered a half polluting caste in these regions where they constituted the minority population. However, they were allowed to enter the Agraharam region. They were forced to reside in separate regions. However, these regions were not as remote as the hamlet of the untouchables. The Nadar climbers were denied the use of the public well and were also refused the service of the barbers and washerman used by the caste Hindus of the village. Landless and economically dependent on the owners of the trees (the owners were mostly the Maravars and Vellalars of this region), the Nadar climbers did the vocation of toddy-tapping during the six month tapping season, from March to September, and worked as agricultural laborers during the rest of the year.

=== Nadar climbers of Travancore ===
Presumably the Nadars of Southern Travancore migrated to Travancore from Tirunelveli in the 16th century after the invasion of the Tirunelveli by the Raja of Travancore. Like their Tirunelveli counterparts, the climbers of Travancore were mostly palmyra climbers. However a significant number of Nadars in Travancore were subtenants to Nair landlords or Vellalar landlords. These Nadar tenants called themselves Nadans and a score of these Nadans also directly had control over the lands. These Nadans enjoyed special privileges under the Raja and claimed that they were superior to Nadar climbers. The climbers of Travancore fared a little better than their Tirunelveli counterparts, but suffered severe social disabilities, unlike their Tirunelveli counterparts, under the rigid caste hierarchy of Travancore. As Swami Vivekanandha once stated, Kerala was like a mad asylum of castes. The Nadar climber women were not allowed to cover their bosoms, to punctuate their low status. However the aristocratic Nadan women, their counterparts, had the rights to cover their bosom. Uneasy with their social status, a large number of Nadar climbers embraced Christianity and became upwardly mobile. Though they improved their status with the aid of Christian missionaries, the outcome of the conversion was not according to the point of view of the missionaries. The Christian Nadar climber women, along with the Hindu Nadar climber women, wore the upper jacket in the manner of upper class women, in order to improve their social status. In turn they were discriminated and even abused by upper class men. One of the Nadan families of Agastheeswaram, instead of supporting their depressed counterparts, supported the upper class men who abused climber women. They claimed that only their women had the right to wear an uppercloth. However after a struggle (Upper cloth revolt) with the authorities of Travancore and also with the aid of the British Christian Missionaries, the depressed Nadar women won themselves the right to wear their upper cloth.

== Occupational hazards ==
The occupation of a Palmyra climber is dangerous and strenuous. A Nadar climber would usually work consistently from morning to night. The climber would ascend at least 30 to 50 palmyra trees everyday and will climb each tree at least twice. Every year many climbers, despite their skill in climbing, fall from the trees and lose their lives or become crippled for life. A climber is capable of swiftly ascending a Palmyra tree, which is usually straight as the mast of a ship.

== Transition from traditional occupation ==
The Nadar climbers south of Tamrabarni began to acquire little plots of lands in the mid 19th century. Many Nadar climbers began to accept Christianity. Mercantilism and education helped the Nadar climbers to become upwardly mobile. With the increase in wealth, the Nadar climbers increasingly began to adopt the title Nadan, a title which was previously reserved for the aristocratic Nelamaikkarars. New economic opportunities encouraged the Nadar climbers to give up their traditional occupation of toddy-tapping for other pursuits.

== Caste fusion ==
After the erection of the Nadar Mahajana Sangam in 1910, the Northern Nadar (Nadars of Northern Tirunelveli) leaders sought to unite the community by encouraging intermarriages within the Nadar sub-castes through a process now known as caste fusion. Historically there were five major Nadar subsects. However, according to the Tuticorin district gazetteer, Nadar climbers are still regarded as a separate sub-caste in Southern Tirunelveli.
