= Villavar =

Hunting and Martial Tribe in Kerala

Villavar was a tribe of hunters that lived in Tamilakam, the southern part of ancient India. The word villavar derives from the Tamil word for bow (vil). The Villavars lived in hill tracts and forests. Chera kings used the title villavan. Kulasekhara Alwar, the founder of the later Chera dynasty, called himself "Villavar Kon", king of Villavars, in a Tamil work written by him known as Perumal Thirumozhi.

== Modern Villavar Descendant Clan ==
- Nadar/Shanar/Chantror- An ancient community from southern Tamil Nadu associated with palm climbing and toddy tapping. Chera symbols such as palmyra tree and bow are closely associated with them.
- Billava- A community population with origin from Aboriginals/ Natives of the Western Ghats and the Western Coast of Karnataka.They may migrated to Coast of Karnataka after the Chola conquered the pallava and Chera lands.The word Pallava means a creeper or branch in Sanskrit. Pallava also means arrow or spruce in Tamil.
- Thiyyar - A community population with origins in the region of western coast and western ghats of old Chera dynasty.
- Bhil - The term "Bhil" itself denotes a large tribal group found in several states of India, notably in the western and central regions. "Villavar" is a term associated with certain Bhil communities, potentially indicating a village-based or specific clan identity.

== Sources ==
- Ramachandran, M. (1991). The Spring of the Indus Civilisation. Prasanna Pathippagam.
