= A. Y. Arulanandasamy Nadar =

Indian politician

Rao Bahadur A. Yagappa Arulanandasamy Nadar (1897–1954) was an Indian politician and philanthropist who served as the municipal chairperson of Thanjavur. He is the elder brother of A. Y. S. Parisutha Nadar. Arulananda Nagar, a residential neighbourhood in Thanjavur is named after him.
