= Thanjavur Assembly constituency =

One of the 234 State Legislative Assembly Constituencies in Tamil Nadu in India

Coordinates: 10.76°N 79.13°E

Thanjavur
- Constituency No. 174 for the Tamil Nadu Legislative Assembly

Constituency details
- Country: India
- Region: South India
- State: Tamil Nadu
- District: Thanjavur
- Lok Sabha constituency: Thanjavur
- Established: 1951
- Total electors: 252,676
- Reservation: None

Member of Legislative Assembly
- 17th Tamil Nadu Legislative Assembly
- Incumbent R. Vijaysaravanan
- Party: TVK
- Elected year: 2026

Thanjavur is a state assembly constituency in Tamil Nadu. Thanjavur was one of 17 assembly constituencies to have a VVPAT facility with EVMs in the 2016 Tamil Nadu Legislative Assembly election. It is one of the 234 State Legislative Assembly Constituencies in Tamil Nadu in India. Former chief minister Karunanidhi represented.

== Members of Legislative Assembly ==
=== Madras State ===
Year	Winner	Party
1952	M. Marimuthu	Indian National Congress
1952	S. Ramalingam	Communist Party of India
1957	A. Y. S. Parisutha Nadar	Indian National Congress
1962	M. Karunanidhi	Dravida Munnetra Kazhagam
1967	A. Y. S. Parisutha Nadar	Indian National Congress

=== Tamil Nadu ===
Year	Winner	Party
1971	S. Natarajan	Dravida Munnetra Kazhagam
1977	S. Natarajan	Dravida Munnetra Kazhagam
1980	S. Natarajan	Dravida Munnetra Kazhagam
1984	Durai Krishnamurthy	Indian National Congress
1989	S. N. M. Ubayadullah	Dravida Munnetra Kazhagam
1991	S. D. Somasundaram	All India Anna Dravida Munnetra Kazhagam
1996	S. N. M. Ubayadullah	Dravida Munnetra Kazhagam
2001	S. N. M. Ubayadullah	Dravida Munnetra Kazhagam
2006	S. N. M. Ubayadullah	Dravida Munnetra Kazhagam
2011	M. Rengasamy	All India Anna Dravida Munnetra Kazhagam
2016 - 2017	M. Rengasamy	All India Anna Dravida Munnetra Kazhagam
2019 by-election	T. K. G. Neelamegam	Dravida Munnetra Kazhagam
2021	T. K. G. Neelamegam	Dravida Munnetra Kazhagam
2026	R. Vijay Saravaran	Tamilaga Vettri Kazhagam

== Election results ==
Vote share of winning candidates
2026	44.12%
2021	53.79%
2019 by-election	46.37%
2016	54.37%
2011	50.57%
2006	50.11%
2001	50.96%
1996	65.82%
1991	58.65%
1989	53.83%
1984	49.90%
1980	50.61%
1977	41.72%
1971	55.72%
1967	53.36%
1962	50.89%
1957	51.35%
1952	20.80%

=== 2026 ===
2026 Tamil Nadu Legislative Assembly election: Thanjavur
Party	Candidate	Votes	%	±%
TVK	R. Vijaysaravanan	87,705	44.12	New
DMK	Shan. Ramanathan	70,750	35.59	▼18.20
BJP	Karuppu Muruganantham	26,790	13.48	New
NTK	N. Krishnakumar	9,383	4.72	▼4.28
NOTA	NOTA	1,274	0.64	▼0.36
Margin of victory		16,955	8.53	▼15.91
Turnout		1,98,798	78.63	▲12.28
Registered electors		2,52,841		▼37,931
TVK gain from DMK		Swing	▲44.12	

=== 2021 ===
2021 Tamil Nadu Legislative Assembly election: Thanjavur
Party	Candidate	Votes	%	±%
DMK	T. K. G. Neelamegam	103,772	53.79%	New
AIADMK	V. Arivudainambi	56,623	29.35%	New
NTK	R. Subadevi	17,366	9.00%	New
MNM	G. Sundaramohan	9,681	5.02%	New
DMDK	Dr. P. Ramanathan	4,246	2.20%	New
NOTA	NOTA	1,938	1.00%	New
Margin of victory		47,149	24.44%	
Turnout		192,921	66.35%	
Rejected ballots		117	0.06%	
Registered electors		290,772		
DMK hold		Swing		

=== 2019 by-election ===
2019 Tamil Nadu Legislative Assembly by-elections: Thanjavur
Party	Candidate	Votes	%	±%
DMK	T. K. G. Neelamegam	88,972	46.37	
AIADMK	R. Gandhi	54,992	28.66	
AMMK	M. Rangaswamy	20,006	10.43	
NTK	M. Karthi	11,182	5.83	
MNM	P. Duraisamy	9,345	4.87	
NOTA	None of the Above	2,797	1.54	
Majority		33,980	17.71	
Turnout		1,91,871	69.16	
DMK gain from AIADMK		Swing		

=== 2016 ===
2016 Tamil Nadu Legislative Assembly election: Thanjavur
Party	Candidate	Votes	%	±%
AIADMK	M. Rangaswamy	1,01,362	54.37	
DMK	Anjugam Boopathy	74,488	39.95	
BJP	Ramalingam M S	3,806	2.04	
NOTA	None of the above	2,295	1.23	
DMDK	Abdullah Sait V	1,534	0.82	
Majority		26,874	14.41	
Turnout		1,86,444	69.37	
AIADMK hold		Swing		

=== 2011 ===
2011 Tamil Nadu Legislative Assembly election: Thanjavur
Party	Candidate	Votes	%	±%
AIADMK	M. Rengasamy	75,415	50.57%	+9.6
DMK	S. N. M. Ubayadullah	68,086	45.66%	−4.46
BJP	M. S. Ramalingam	1,901	1.27%	−0.4
IJK	P. Rayar Victor Arokiyaraj	1,505	1.01%	New
Margin of victory		7,329	4.91%	−4.23%
Turnout		149,130	73.83%	7.56%
Registered electors		202,002		
AIADMK gain from DMK		Swing	0.46%	

=== 2006 ===
2006 Tamil Nadu Legislative Assembly election: Thanjavur
Party	Candidate	Votes	%	±%
DMK	S. N. M. Ubayadullah	61,658	50.11%	−0.85
AIADMK	M. Rengasamy	50,412	40.97%	New
DMDK	P. Sivanesan	7,484	6.08%	New
BJP	M. S. Ramalingam	2,057	1.67%	New
Independent	A. Nagendran	756	0.61%	New
Margin of victory		11,246	9.14%	0.38%
Turnout		123,038	66.26%	17.38%
Registered electors		185,684		
DMK hold		Swing	-0.85%	

=== 2001 ===
2001 Tamil Nadu Legislative Assembly election: Thanjavur
Party	Candidate	Votes	%	±%
DMK	S. N. M. Ubayadullah	55,782	50.96%	−14.86
INC	R. Rajmohan	46,192	42.20%	New
MDMK	G. Anna	4,289	3.92%	−0.23
Independent	V. Pandiyan	738	0.67%	New
JD(U)	S. Paramanandam	734	0.67%	New
Margin of victory		9,590	8.76%	−28.58%
Turnout		109,460	48.88%	−16.80%
Registered electors		224,016		
DMK hold		Swing	-14.86%	

=== 1996 ===
1996 Tamil Nadu Legislative Assembly election: Thanjavur
Party	Candidate	Votes	%	±%
DMK	S. N. M. Ubayadullah	79,471	65.82%	+25.27
AIADMK	S. D. Somasundaram	34,389	28.48%	−30.17
MDMK	K. Veluchamy	5,012	4.15%	New
Margin of victory		45,082	37.34%	19.24%
Turnout		120,738	65.68%	4.46%
Registered electors		188,675		
DMK gain from AIADMK		Swing	7.17%	

=== 1991 ===
1991 Tamil Nadu Legislative Assembly election: Thanjavur
Party	Candidate	Votes	%	±%
AIADMK	S. D. Somasundaram	64,363	58.65%	+35.89
DMK	S. N. M. Ubayadullah	44,502	40.55%	−13.28
Margin of victory		19,861	18.10%	−12.97%
Turnout		109,736	61.22%	−10.18%
Registered electors		183,277		
AIADMK gain from DMK		Swing	4.82%	

=== 1989 ===
1989 Tamil Nadu Legislative Assembly election: Thanjavur
Party	Candidate	Votes	%	±%
DMK	S. N. M. Ubayadullah	60,380	53.83%	+5.76
AIADMK	Thirugnanam Durai	25,527	22.76%	New
INC	Durai Krishnamoorty	20,383	18.17%	−31.73
AIADMK	K. Manivasham	4,771	4.25%	New
Margin of victory		34,853	31.07%	29.24%
Turnout		112,165	71.40%	−1.38%
Registered electors		159,359		
DMK gain from INC		Swing	3.93%	

=== 1984 ===
1984 Tamil Nadu Legislative Assembly election: Thanjavur
Party	Candidate	Votes	%	±%
INC	Durai Krishnamurthy	48,065	49.90%	New
DMK	P. S. Thangamuthu Nattar	46,304	48.08%	−2.53
INC(J)	M. K. Gadhadaran	1,327	1.38%	New
Independent	T. A. Bakthavachalam	618	0.64%	New
Margin of victory		1,761	1.83%	0.62%
Turnout		96,314	72.78%	9.20%
Registered electors		135,351		
INC gain from DMK		Swing	-0.70%	

=== 1980 ===
1980 Tamil Nadu Legislative Assembly election: Thanjavur
Party	Candidate	Votes	%	±%
DMK	S. Natarajan	40,880	50.61%	+8.88
Independent	A. Ramamurthy	39,901	49.39%	New
Margin of victory		979	1.21%	−10.97%
Turnout		80,781	63.58%	−0.41%
Registered electors		128,484		
DMK hold		Swing	8.88%	

=== 1977 ===
1977 Tamil Nadu Legislative Assembly election: Thanjavur
Party	Candidate	Votes	%	±%
DMK	S. Natarajan	33,418	41.72%	−14
AIADMK	R. Saminathan	23,662	29.54%	New
INC	T. P. Murugesan	16,584	20.71%	−23.57
JP	V. Vaithiyalingam	6,037	7.54%	New
Margin of victory		9,756	12.18%	0.73%
Turnout		80,092	63.99%	−12.01%
Registered electors		126,647		
DMK hold		Swing	-14.00%	

=== 1971 ===
1971 Tamil Nadu Legislative Assembly election: Thanjavur
Party	Candidate	Votes	%	±%
DMK	S. Natarajan	38,288	55.72%	+9.61
INC	A. Y. Arokiasamy Nadar	30,423	44.28%	−9.09
Margin of victory		7,865	11.45%	4.20%
Turnout		68,711	76.00%	−3.98%
Registered electors		92,679		
DMK gain from INC		Swing	2.36%	

=== 1967 ===
1967 Madras Legislative Assembly election: Thanjavur
Party	Candidate	Votes	%	±%
INC	A. Y. S. Parisutha Nadar	33,228	53.36%	+5.52
DMK	S. Natarajan	28,717	46.12%	−4.78
ABJS	V. S. Subramanian	324	0.52%	New
Margin of victory		4,511	7.24%	4.19%
Turnout		62,269	79.98%	−0.99%
Registered electors		79,669		
INC gain from DMK		Swing	2.47%	

=== 1962 ===
1962 Madras Legislative Assembly election: Thanjavur
Party	Candidate	Votes	%	±%
DMK	M. Karunanidhi	32,145	50.89%	New
INC	A. Y. S. Parisutha Nadar	30,217	47.84%	−3.5
Independent	Shanmuga Vadivel	799	1.27%	New
Margin of victory		1,928	3.05%	−20.49%
Turnout		63,161	80.97%	28.81%
Registered electors		79,718		
DMK gain from INC		Swing	-0.45%	

=== 1957 ===
1957 Madras Legislative Assembly election: Thanjavur
Party	Candidate	Votes	%	±%
INC	A. Y. S. Parisutha Nadar	21,810	51.35%	+30.55
Independent	R. Gopalakrishnan	11,809	27.80%	New
Independent	S. Bethannu Nadar	8,858	20.85%	New
Margin of victory		10,001	23.54%	21.20%
Turnout		42,477	52.16%	−37.65%
Registered electors		81,430		
INC hold		Swing	30.55%	

=== 1952 ===
1952 Madras Legislative Assembly election: Thanjavur
Party	Candidate	Votes	%	±%
INC	M. Marimuthu	27,712	20.80%	New
CPI	S. Ramalingam	24,585	18.45%	New
INC	R. Swaminatha Mercondar	23,332	17.51%	New
Independent	R. Shanmugan	22,865	17.16%	New
Independent	R. Gopalakrishnan	12,244	9.19%	New
Independent	R. Narayanaswami	4,492	3.37%	New
Independent	A. Lakshmana Marupathiar	4,226	3.17%	New
Akhil Bharat Hindu Maha Sabha	S. Srinivasachari	3,195	2.40%	New
Independent	P. Natarajan	3,080	2.31%	New
Independent	T. K. Singarvelu	2,618	1.96%	New
Independent	V. Govindan	2,523	1.89%	New
Margin of victory		3,127	2.35%	
Turnout		133,240	89.81%	
Registered electors		148,355		
INC win (new seat)				
