= S. Natarajan =

Indian politician

S. Natarajan Udayar was an Indian politician and 3 time DMK MLA from Thanjavur Constituency. A close friend and supporter of Periyar E.V. Ramaswamy, he was an early member of Dravidar Kazhagam. His association with Aringar C N Annadurai made him part ways with E.V.R. politically and join Dravida Munnetra Kazhagam (DMK) as one of the earliest and founding members of DMK.

He started as a basic member with no oratorical skills or influence in print or media, yet he played a pivotal role in dislodging Indian National Congress from its strong hold on Thanjavur.

A. Y. S. Parisutha Nadar had held the Thanjavur Constituency for three consecutive terms under Indian National Congress banner. A great philanthropist and reformer, A. Y. S. Parisutha Nadar seemed irreplaceable, until Natarajan representing DMK set to work for the welfare of the constituency.

He was a member of Tamil Nadu legislative assembly elected as a Dravida Munnetra Kazhagam candidate. He was elected from Thanjavur constituency three times in 1971, 1977 and 1980. He died on 23 February 1984 during his third term in office. Periyar E. V. Ramaswamy, Tamil Comedian N. S. Krishnan was a close friend and follower of Periyar.W. P. A. Soundarapandian Nadar was a close confidant of Periyar; C. N. Annadurai; E. V. K. Sampath; V. R. Nedunchezhiyan; Mathialagan, Nanjil Manoharan; actor M.G Ramachandran (popularly known as MGR) who shared a special bond and respect for Thanjai SN or Thanjai Natarajan

Natarajan was MLA from Dravida Munnetra Kazhagam for three times.

== Professional career ==
S. Natarajan was on ethe earliest Income Tax payers in Tamilandu, running a very successful Construction company - taking up government project to lay Highways across Tamilnadu. He was also an avid traditional agriculturist, he owned 9000acres of agricultural lands in and around Thanjavur. When he entered politics in 1960, he gave away large parts of the land under land ceiling act and gave up ownership of construction company to his partners - as by law - MLC/ MLA candidates should not own businesses. He was a man of principle.

== Political career ==
=== Entry into Politics ===
Self-Respect Movement, anti-Hindi agitations of 1937–40, Dravidar Kazhagam; Self-respect marriages

=== Split with Annadurai ===
Periyar assumed that independent India would bring South Indians, especially Tamils, under the dominance of Brahmins and North Indians. For these reasons Periyar called for 15 August 1947, the day of Indian independence, to be a day of mourning. Periyar's chief lieutenant, Conjeevaram Natarajan Annadurai opposed this move and the schism between his supporters and Periyar widened. He saw the gaining of independence as an overall achievement of India rather than solely that of Aryan North.

In 1949, Annadurai, established a separate association called the Dravida Munnetra Kazhagam (DMK), or Dravidian Advancement Association. This was due to the differences between the two, where Periyar advocated a separate independent Dravidian or Tamil state, while Annadurai compromised with the Delhi government combined with claims of increased state independence.

Periyar was convinced that individuals and movements that undertake the task of eradicating the social evils in the Indian sub-continent have to pursue the goal with devotion and dedication without deviating from the path and with uncompromising zeal. Thus, if they contest elections aiming to assume political power, they would lose vigour and sense of purpose. But among his followers, there were those who had a different view, wanting to enter into politics and have a share in running the government.

They were looking for an opportunity to part with Periyar. Thus, when Periyar married Maniammai on 9 July 1948, they quit the Dravidar Kazhagam, stating that Periyar set a bad example by marrying a young woman that too his foster child in his old age – he was 70 and she 30. Those who parted company with Periyar joined the DMK.

Though the DMK split from the Dravidar Kazhagam, the organisation made efforts to carry on Periyar's Self-Respect Movement to villagers and urban students.

The DMK advocated the thesis that the Tamil language was much richer than Sanskrit and Hindi in content, and thus was a key which opened the door to subjects to be learned. The Dravidar Kazhagam continued to counter Brahminism, Indo-Aryan propaganda, and uphold the Dravidians' right of self-determination.

Against C. Rajagopalachari (or Rajaji), the then Chief Minister of Madras State, for introducing a new educational system that indirectly encouraged traditional caste-based occupations called Kulak kalvit thittam Against renaming Kallakkudi to Dalmiyapuram as the name Dalmiyapuram symbolised north Indian domination. He was eventually sentenced to three months' imprisonment for this protest.

=== Anti-Hindi agitations ===
When India became a republic with its own constitution in 1950, the constitution had given special status to the Hindi language, which was to gain official status after 15 years in 1965. This move was regarded with anxiety by students in Tamil Nadu. Speaking of making Hindi as an official language of India, Annadurai said It is claimed that Hindi should be the common language because it is spoken by the majority. Why should we then claim the tiger as our national animal instead of the rat which is so much more numerous? Or the peacock as our national bird when the crow is ubiquitous?.

In view of the continued threat to impose Hindi, the DMK held an open-air conference against Hindi imposition at Kodambakkam, Chennai in August 1960, which Annadurai presided over. He gave black flags to leading functionaries, to be shown to the President of India during his visit to the state.

Sensing an uprising, Prime Minister Jawaharlal Nehru assured in the Parliament that English would continue to be the official language of India, as long as non-Hindi speaking people desire. DMK gave up the plan of showing black flags and Annadurai appealed to the Union Government to bring about a constitutional amendment incorporating the assurance.

With no constitutional amendment done, Annadurai declared 26 January 1965, the 15th Republic Day of India and also the day the Constitution, which in essence enshrined Hindi as the official language of India, came into practice, as a day of mourning.

This move was opposed by the then Chief Minister of Madras State, Bhakthavatchalam, as blasphemous. Hence Annadurai, who by then had been trying to shake off the secessionist image of his party, declared 24 January as a day of mourning. He also replaced the slogan of the protests to Down with Hindi; Long live the Republic.

Nevertheless, violence broke out on 26 January, initially in Madurai which within days spread throughout the state. Robert Hardgrave Jr, professor of humanities, government and Asian studies, suggests that the elements contributing to the riots were not instigated by DMK or Leftists or even the industrialists, as the Congress government of the state suggested, but were genuine frustrations and discontentment which lay beneath the surface of the people of the state.

With violence surging, Annadurai asked the students to forfeit the protests, but some DMK leaders like Karunanidhi kept the agitations going. Nevertheless, Annadurai was arrested for instigating the agitation. Although the violence was not directly instigated by the DMK, the agitation itself aided DMK to win the 1967 elections and Annadurai became the new Chief Minister of Madras State.

Anna was instrumental in organizing the World Tamil Conference under the aegies of UNESCO in 1967. Another major achievement of Annadurai's government was to introduce a two language policy over the then popular three language formula. The three language formula, which was implemented in the neighbouring states of Karnataka, Andhra Pradesh and Kerala, entitled students to study three languages: the regional language, English and Hindi.

It was during the period of his Chief Ministership that the Second World conference was conducted on a grand scale on 3 January 1968. Nevertheless, when a commemorative stamp was released to mark the Tamil conference, Annadurai expressed his dissatisfaction that the stamp contained Hindi when it was for Tamil.

The Anti-Hindi agitations of 1965 forced the central government to abandon its efforts to impose Hindi as the only official language of the country; still, Hindi imposition continued as Indian government employees are asked to write as much as 65% of the letters and memoranda in Hindi.

=== King Maker ===
In 1967, DMK came to power in Madras province 18 years after its formation and 10 years after it had first entered electoral politics. This began the Dravidian era in Madras province which later became Tamil Nadu.

In 1969, the party general secretary and founder, CN Annadurai died. After his death, there came the power tussle between M. Karunanidhi and V. R. Nedunchezhiyan. Most of the elected MLAs of DMK, including leaders like Mathialagan, Nanjil Manoharan and the celluloid hero MGR favoured Karunanidhi as CM in preference to Nedunchezhiyan, the Senior leader after Anna.

To pacify V. R. Nedunchezhiyan a new post called party president was created for M. Karunanidhi and for V. R. Nedunchezhiyan was the post of general secretary. MGR was appointed as the Treasurer of the Party.

In 1971 election, the DMK fought in alliance with Congress (Indira) and the Opposition alliance which consisted of the two Senior National Leaders, Rajaji and Kamarajar was termed as a strong alliance and was widely supported by Media to re-capture power in Tamil Nadu. However, the DMK emerged victorious with a vast majority of 184 seats out of 234 and M. Karunanidhi became the chief minister for the second time. The Opposition Grand alliance could capture only 25 seats.

Karunanidhi was first elected to the Tamil Nadu assembly in 1957 from the Kulithalai assembly of Thiruchirapalli district. He became the DMK treasurer in 1961 and deputy leader of opposition in the state assembly in the year 1962 and when the DMK came to power in 1967, he became the minister for public works.

When Annadurai expired in 1969, Karunanidhi became the Chief Minister of Tamil Nadu. He has held various positions in the party and government during his long career in Tamil Nadu political arena. However, he suffered multiple electoral defeats against his primary opponent M. G. Ramachandran's ADMK until the latter's death in 1987.

Indira Gandhi dismissed the Karunanidhi government in 1976 based on charges of possible secession and corruption.

After M. G. Ramachandran expired, Karunanidhi was the only one big tree to rule Tamil Nadu. No one was there to stand against him (as an opposite party) in legislative election. Also there was dispute between M.G.R's wife (Janaki Ramachandran) and J. Jayalalithaa about leading ADMK party after MGR's death. Since after people who knows politics started calling him as King maker.

== Death ==
He died on 23 February 1984 during his third term in office.

== Legacy ==
After his electoral success with his DMK in 1967, the Congress has not yet returned to power in Tamil Nadu. His government was the first in the country to be from a non-Congress party with the ·full majority.

Tamil Nadu State Assembly Elections - Thanjavur Constituency (MLA - 3 consecutive terms)
Year	Winner	Party
1971	S. Natarajan	Dravida Munnetra Kazhagam
1977	S. Natarajan	Dravida Munnetra Kazhagam
1980	S. Natarajan	Dravida Munnetra Kazhagam
