= T. K. G. Neelamegam =

Indian politician

- டி.கே.ஜி. நீலமேகம்
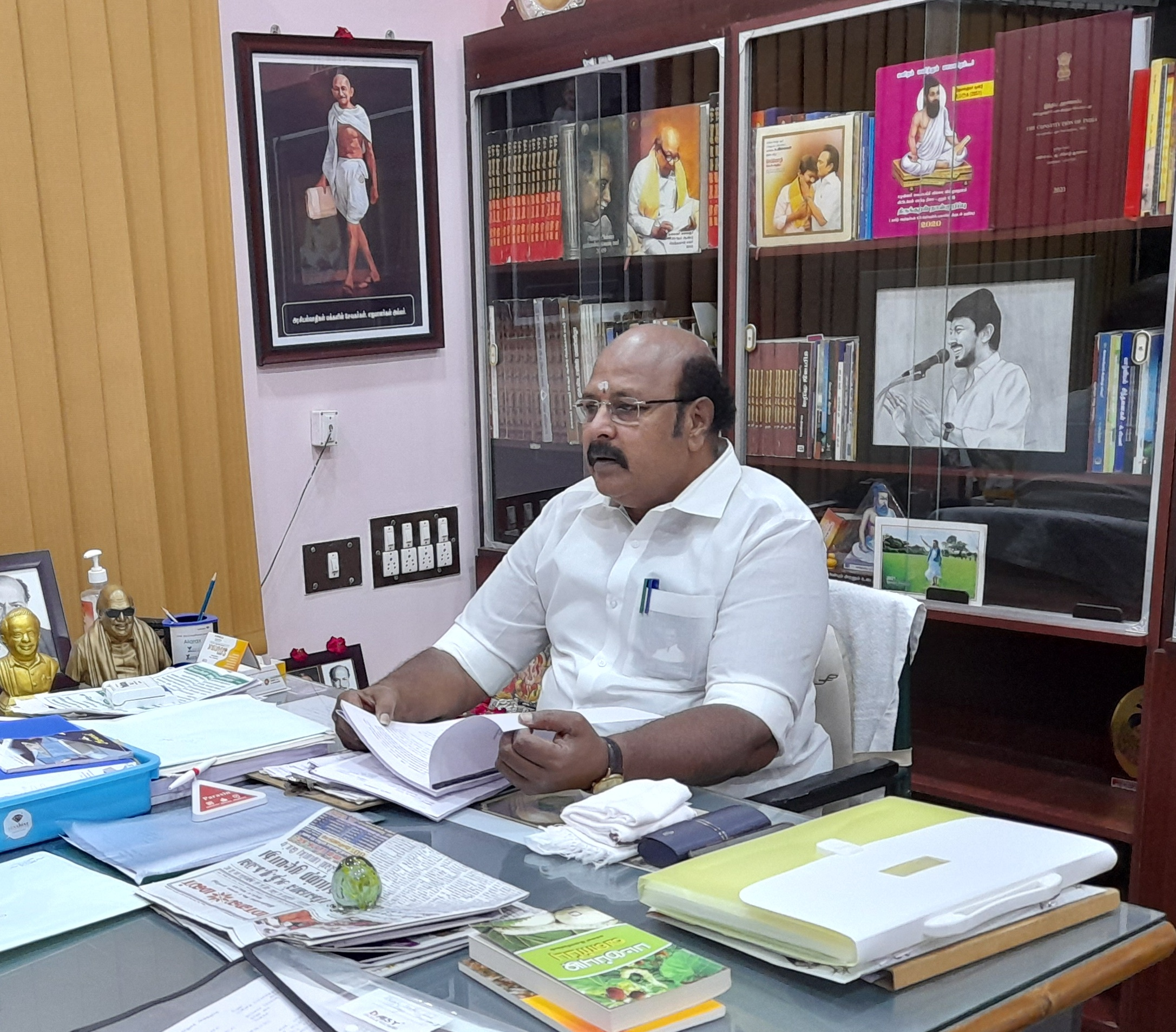
- TKG Neelamegam, Member of Legislative Assembly.

Member of Tamil Nadu Legislative Assembly
- In office 23 May 2019 – 4 May 2026
- Constituency: Thanjavur constituency

Personal details
- Born: 27 September 1963 (age 63) Thanjavur, India
- Party: Dravida Munnetra Kazhagam

T. K. Govindan Neelamegam (born 27 September 1963) is an Indian politician and is Member of the Legislative Assembly of Tamil Nadu representing Thanjavur. His father T.K. Govindan is a well known Politician and very close to the former chief minister M. Karunanithi and he is a senior leader of DMK. T. K. G. Neelamegam is the Thanjavur town secretary, and a member of Dravida Munnetra Kazhagam.

== Elections contested ==
Election	Constituency	Party	Result	Vote %	Runner-up	Runner-up Party	Runner-up vote %	Ref.
2019 Tamil Nadu Legislative Assembly by-elections	Thanjavur	DMK	Won	46.37	R. Gandhi	AIADMK	28.66	
2021 Tamil Nadu Legislative Assembly election	Thanjavur	DMK	Won	53.79	V. Arivudainambi	AIADMK	29.35	
