= Nador (disambiguation) =

Nador is a city in the Rif region of Morocco.

Nador may also refer to:

== Places ==
- Nador, Tipaza, Algeria, a town
- Nador Province, Oriental Region, Morocco
- Nador International Airport, serving Nador, Morocco

== People ==
- Nador (caste), a caste from Karnataka, India
- Steven Nador (born 2002), Togolese footballer
- Zsuzsa Nádor (1927–2015), Hungarian swimmer

== Other uses ==
- HA Nador, a football club in Nador, Morocco
- Nador transmitter, a transmission facility in Morocco

== See also ==
- Nador Port, a port in the Rif region of Morocco
- Fath de Nador, a football club in Nador, Morocco
- Nadar (disambiguation)
- Nader, a given name and surname
