= Nadan (subcaste) =

Sub-caste of Nadar caste in Tamil Nadu, India

Nadans (also referred as Nelamaikkarar) are a small endogamous group of aristocratic Nadars from the regions south of the Thamirabarani River in the present-day state of Tamil Nadu, India. They were hereditary tax collectors during the Nayak and Pandyan rule and also served as petty lords under the poligars. The Nadans possessed vast tracts of land and were one of the few sub-castes among the Nadars to have practiced aristocracy. The term Nadan means lords of the land.

== History ==
As hereditary tax collectors, the Nadans held civil authority over the lands in their control. The term Nadan means lords of the land. The Nadar climbers were totally dependent on these powerful landlords and treated them with great respect. In the regions dominated by the Nadans, even the Vellalar accountant or the Brahmin priest would show deference to the position of the Nadan lords. They rode horses and would buy slaves to work in their houses to retain their proud customs. The Nadan women followed strict gosha, revealing themselves only to the men of their own household, and rode in covered palanquins. The Nadans built Hindu temples and also bore festival expenses. The oldest and highest Nadans were the Adityans of Kayamozhi, who claimed they were the descendants of Surya, the sun god. The Adityans also had special rights at the Shiva temple in Thiruchendur, where they constructed one of its pavilions. They usually donated the huge wooden car to the temple and in return were given the privilege to be the first to touch the rope which would pull the car through the streets during festival times.

Despite their great wealth and power the Nadans, however, were considered as a portion of the greater class of Nadars and were denied entrance into temples built by higher castes. The Nadans shared the pollution of the lowest climbers. The Nadans would not enter Hindu temples built by higher castes until the issue was solved through campaigning movements and legislation. They claim that they were stripped of their rights and privileges due to the Nayak invasion. The Nadar community was then divided into different opposing groups, with each Nadar climber owing allegiance to a Nadan family. The control of the lands may pass from one Nadan to another but the climbers remained always with the trees assigned to them.

=== Opposing Christianity ===
In 1680, the first congregation of Nadars was started at Vadakkankulam with the conversion of a Nadar woman. The Nadar converts came neither from the lowest sections (Kalla Shanar) of the castes nor from the highest (Nadans), but from the middle subgroups and particularly the climbers. The converts were provided protection by the missionaries from the oppressions of Nadan landlords. With their traditional dominance threatened, the Nadans became the missionaries' greatest adversaries. Many Nadans supported anti-Christian societies such as the Vibuthi Sangam(the Sacred Ashes Society). However, by the 1860s the opposition of the Nadans began to wane. Eventually a few Nadans actually converted to Christianity.

=== Nadars of Travancore ===
The Nadar climbers of Southern Travancore served as palmyra climbers on the lands of aristocratic Nadans in the eastern portion of Kanniyakumari. In the tradition of these Nadan families, the lands were bestowed by the kings of Travancore in return for the Nadans' services.

== Distinctions within the Nadar community today ==
During the 1960s, the Nadan families had some aura of aristocracy and authority. The distinctions that separated them from the rest of the Nadar community were largely gone, as the Nadar climbers gained wealth. The once Nadar climbers are today widely into education, business and other important fields.
