= R. Vijaysaravanan =

Indian politician

Member of the Tamil Nadu Legislative Assembly
- Incumbent
- Assumed office 2026
- Preceded by: T. K. G. Neelamegam
- Constituency: Thanjavur

Personal details
- Party: Tamilaga Vettri Kazhagam
- Profession: Politician

R. Vijaysaravanan is an Indian politician from Tamil Nadu. He is a member of the Tamil Nadu Legislative Assembly from Thanjavur representing Tamilaga Vettri Kazhagam.

== Political career ==
Vijaysaravanan won the Thanjavur seat in the 2026 Tamil Nadu Legislative Assembly election as a candidate of Tamilaga Vettri Kazhagam. He received 87,705 votes and defeated Ramanathan of the Dravida Munnetra Kazhagam by a margin of 16,955 votes.
