= ASBA =

Type of application for public offering in India

Applications Supported by Blocked Amount (ASBA) is a process developed by the India's Stock Market Regulator SEBI for applying to IPO. In ASBA, an IPO applicant's account doesn't get debited until shares are allotted to them.

Earlier Qualified Institutional Buyers were only allowed to participate in IPOs through ASBA facility. Currently as per SEBI guidelines, all three categories of investors, i.e., Retail Investors, Qualified Institutional Buyers, Non-Institutional Investors, making application in public/rights issue shall mandatorily make use of ASBA facility.

ASBA process facilitates retail individual investors bidding at a cut-off, with a single option, to apply through Self Certified Syndicate Banks (SCSBs), in which the investors have bank accounts. SCSBs are those banks which satisfy the conditions laid by SEBI. SCSBs would accept the applications, verify the application, block the fund to the extent of bid payment amount, upload the details in the web based bidding system of NSE, unblock once basis of allotment is finalized and transfer the amount for allotted shares to the issuer.

ASBA means “Applications Supported by Blocked Amount”. ASBA is an application containing an authorization to block the application money in the bank account, for subscribing to an issue. If an investor is applying through ASBA, his application money shall be debited from the bank account only if his/her application is selected for allotment after the basis of allotment is finalized, or the issue is withdrawn/failed.

It is a supplementary process of applying in Initial Public Offers (IPO) and Follow-On Public Offers (FPO) made through Book Building route and co-exists with the current process of using cheque as a mode of payment and submitting applications. ASBA (Applications Supported by Blocked Amount) is a process developed by India's Stock Market Regulator SEBI for applying to IPOs, Rights issue, FPS etc.

ASBA is stipulated by SEBI, and available from most of the banks operating in India. This allows the investors money to remain with the bank till the shares are allotted after the IPO. Only then does the money transfer out of the investors account to the company. This eliminates the need for refunds on shares not being allotted.

As of September, 2024, 53 Banks are acting as SCSBs. Investors may submit their ASBA Applications to these SCSBs in order to apply for Public Issues. The list of SCSBs include the likes of The Jammu & Kashmir Bank Limited, Bank of India, Axis Bank, HDFC Bank, ICICI Bank, Kotak Mahindra Bank, Karnataka Bank Limited, State Bank of India, Punjab National Bank, UCO Bank, IDBI Bank among others.

Most of large banks provide online ASBA facility for its customers through their online net-banking and mobile-banking facilities.

== Benefits of ASBA ==
1. The investor need not pay the application money by cheque rather block his / her bank account to the extent of the application money, thus continue to earn interest on application money.
2. The investor does not have to bother about refunds, as in ASBA only an amount proportionate to the securities allotted is taken from the bank account when his / her application is selected for allotment after the basis of allotment is finalized.
3. Customer can revise / withdraw the bid before the end of the Issue in the prescribed format with the Bank.

== Drawbacks of ASBA ==
1. The investor will have to ensure he / she has a bank account in the bank that provides online ASBA facility, otherwise one has to visit the branch and submit the ASBA form.
2. Any investor who has bank account in a Bank doesn't provide Online ASBA facility, and the investor is not able to visit the branch in person, will have to forfeit the opportunity.
3. The process is also prone to error because the details (demat account number, depository id, or no. of share in FPO) investor fills in the ASBA application can not be validated by the bank. So, any error in typo may result in potential rejection of the application.
