= Nadar Mahajana Sangam =

Caste based organisation in South India

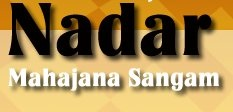
Nadar

Nadar Mahajana Sangam was an organization established, due to the efforts of T. Ratnasamy Nadar, in 1910. It was open to any Nadar male of any subcaste or religion. The general purpose of the association was to uplift the Nadar community. Rattinasami Nadar's uncle, V. Ponnusami Nadar, was elected the first president of the association.

There are several schools and colleges under the control of Nadar Mahajana Sangam.

== Formation of Nadar Bank ==
The thought of establishing a bank under the guidance of the able Nadar business community was mooted out in the Anniversary of Nadar Mahajana Sangam held at Tuticorin in 1920. The proposal was effected soon. The bank was opened by Shri. T. V. Balagurusamy Nadar, the then President of Nadar Mahajana Sangam and the bank threw open its door to the public on November 11, 1921 at 9 a.m. in Ana Mavanna Building at South Raja Street, Tuticorin.

== Politics ==
In the 1920s and 1930s, Nadar Mahajana Sangam supported the non-Brahmin movement and Justice party. W. P. A. Soundarapandian Nadar, one of the eminent leaders of Nadar Mahajana Sangam, led the effort to ally the community with Periyar E. V. Ramasamy's Self-respect movement. The Nadars joined the Justice party in its attack against Brahmins on cultural and religious front.

== See also ==
- Nadar Mahajana Sangam S. Vellaichamy Nadar College
