= M. Marimuthu (Thanjavur MLA) =

Indian politician

M. Marimuthu was an Indian politician and former Member of the Legislative Assembly of Tamil Nadu. He was elected to the Tamil Nadu legislative assembly as an Indian National Congress candidate from Thanjavur constituency in 1952 election. He was the winner one of the two candidates elected for Thanjavur constituency
