= Channar revolt =

Upper cloth controversy

The Channar Lahala or Channar revolt, also called Maru Marakkal Samaram, refers to the fight from 1813 to 1859 of Nadar climber women in Travancore kingdom of India for the right to wear upper-body clothes covering their breasts.

== Background ==
In 19th century Travancore, baring of one's chest to higher status people was considered a sign of respect by both males and females. This applied to those of the lower status castes, such as the Nadar climbers. Even women of other dominant castes like the Nairs had to keep their breasts bare in the presence of Brahmin men. The Nayar women in Travancore were allowed to dress as they pleased by a Royal Proclamation in 1865. Brahmin women bare their breasts only in front of the deity in the temple. Before the arrival of Christian missionaries, it was common for women to go topless in Kerala in the 18th century.

Higher-class women covered both breasts and shoulders with a piece of material known as the upper-cloth unless in the presence of people of still higher-ranked communities, whereas Nadar climber women were not allowed to cover their bosoms, as most of the women in Kerala, to punctuate their low status. Uneasy with their social status, a large number of Nadar climbers embraced Christianity, and started to wear "long cloths," strengthened by their new belief system, which offered equal rights to all men (and women). When many more Nadars turned to Christianity, many Nadar women started to wear the brahmin breast cloth.

== 1813–1829 grants and withdrawals ==
The Nadar women successfully campaigned to be allowed to cover their breasts. In 1813, Colonel John Munro, British dewan in the Travancore court, issued an order granting permission to women converted to Christianity to wear upper cloth. The order was withdrawn when pindakars, members of the Raja's council, complained about this, arguing that this right would obliterate caste-differences, and lead to widespread 'pollution' in the state. Nadar women were forbidden to wear the Nair sharf, and instead were allowed to wear the kuppayam, a type of jacket worn by Syrian Christians, Shonagas, and Mappilas. The women were not satisfied, continuing to fight for the right to wear upper cloth "like any other woman in the higher castes," and preferring breast-clothing in the Nair-style. This led to increasing violence in the 1820s against Nadar women, and also the burning of schools and churches. In 1828 the Travancore government again forbade Nadar women the Nair-style breast-clothes, but permitted the wearing of the jacket. In 1829, the Travancore queen, Gowri Parvati Bayi, issued yet another proclamation, which denied the right of Nadar women to wear upper cloths.

== 1859 proclamation ==
In 1858, new violence broke out in several places in Travancore. On 26 July 1859, under pressure from Charles Trevelyan, the Madras Governor, the king of Travancore issued a proclamation proclaiming the right for all Nadar women to cover their breasts, either by wearing jackets, like the Christian Nadars, or tie coarse-cloth around their upper-body, like the Mukkavattigal (fisher-women). Yet they were still not allowed to cover their breasts in the style of the higher-class Nair women. Nadar women continued to ignore the restrictions, developing an upper-wear style that resembled the style of the higher class Hindu women, but offended some Hindus as a provocation by the missionaries. The code was still discriminatory until 1915–1916, and the challenge was supported by Ayyankali.

== Further emancipation ==
After the revolt, pamphlets appeared putting forth the claims of Kshatriya status of the Nadars. Members of the caste claimed the right to wear the sacred thread and to ride palanquins to wedding ceremonies. By 1891 at least 24,000 Nadars had given their caste to the census enumerator as being kshatriya.

== Controversy ==
The CBSE in December 2016 issued a circular to all 19,000 affiliated schools under it asking that a section 'Caste Conflict and Dress Change' – a chapter that included the Channar revolt – be omitted from the curriculum with effect from 2017.

== See also ==
- Sivakasi riots of 1899
- Nangeli

== Sources ==
- Kent, Eliza.F. (2004), Gender and Protestant Christianity in Colonial South India, Oxford University Press, doi:10.1093/0195165071.001.0001, ISBN 9780195165074
- Bendix, Reinhard; Brand, Coenraad (1973), State and Society: A Reader in Comparative Political Sociology, University of California Press, ISBN 9780520024908
- Billington Harper, Susan (2000), In the Shadow of the Mahatma, Wm. B. Eerdmans Publishing, ISBN 0-8028-3874-X
- Cohn, Bernard S. (1996), Colonialism and Its Forms of Knowledge, Princeton University Press, ISBN 9780691000435
- Hardgrave, Robert (1969), The Nadars of Tamilnad: The Political Culture of a Community in Change, University of California Press
- Jones, Kenneth W. (1989), Socio-Religious Reform Movements in British India, Cambridge University Press, ISBN 0-521-24986-4
- Kertzer, David I. (1988), Ritual, Politics, and Power, Yale University Press, ISBN 0300043627
- Ponnumuthan, Selvister (1996), The Spirituality of Basic Ecclesial Communities in the Socio-religious Context of Trivandrum/Kerala, India, Universita Gregoriana, ISBN 9788876527210
- Ross, Robert (2008), Clothing: A Global History, Polity
