= W. P. A. Soundarapandian Nadar =

Indian politician (1893–1953)

W. P. A Soundarapandian
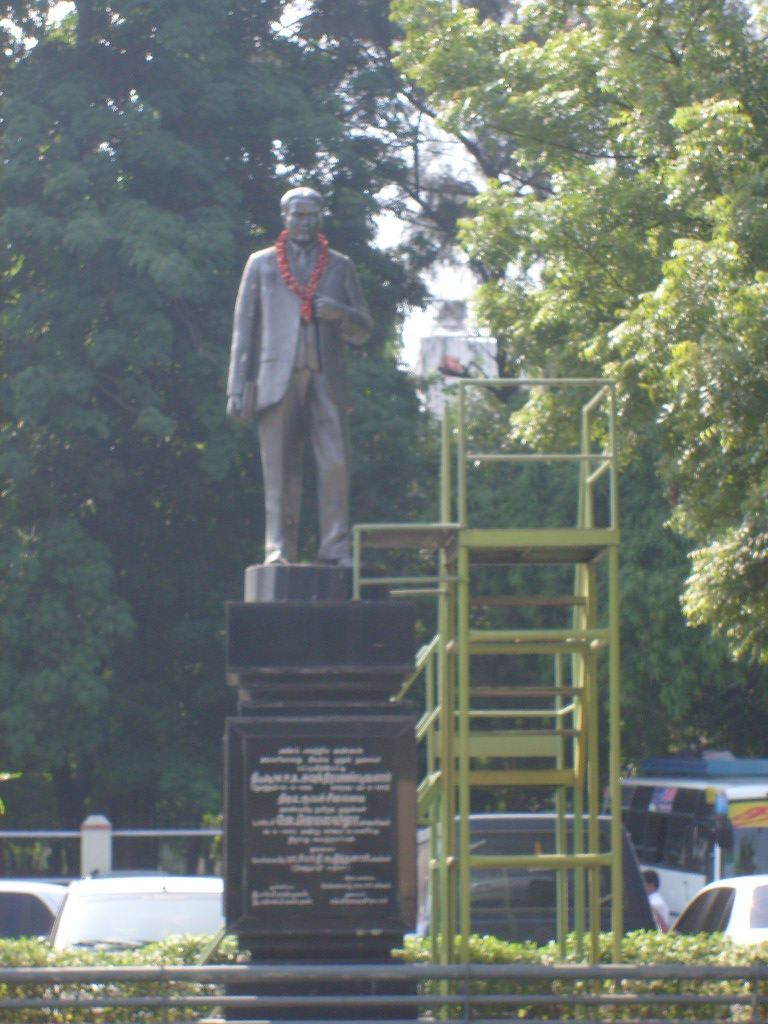
- Statue of W. P. A. Soundrapandian at the entrance to Theagaraya Road, Chennai
- Born: 15 September 1893; Pattiveeranpatti
- Died: 22 February 1953 (aged 59)
- Occupations: Leader of Nadar Mahajan Sangam and Member of Madras Legislative Council

Woothampatti Punnaivana Ayya Soundarapandian (15 September 1893 – 22 February 1953) was a leading figure in Nadar Mahajana Sangam who became the first Nadar member of the Madras Legislative Council upon a recommendation by P. T. Rajan in 1920. Nadar's family had previously supported and worked for the electoral victory of P. T. Rajan. He is known for his effort to associate the Nadar community with the Self-Respect Movement founded by Periyar E. V. Ramasamy. He was known as the "uncrowned king of the Nadar community".

== Background ==
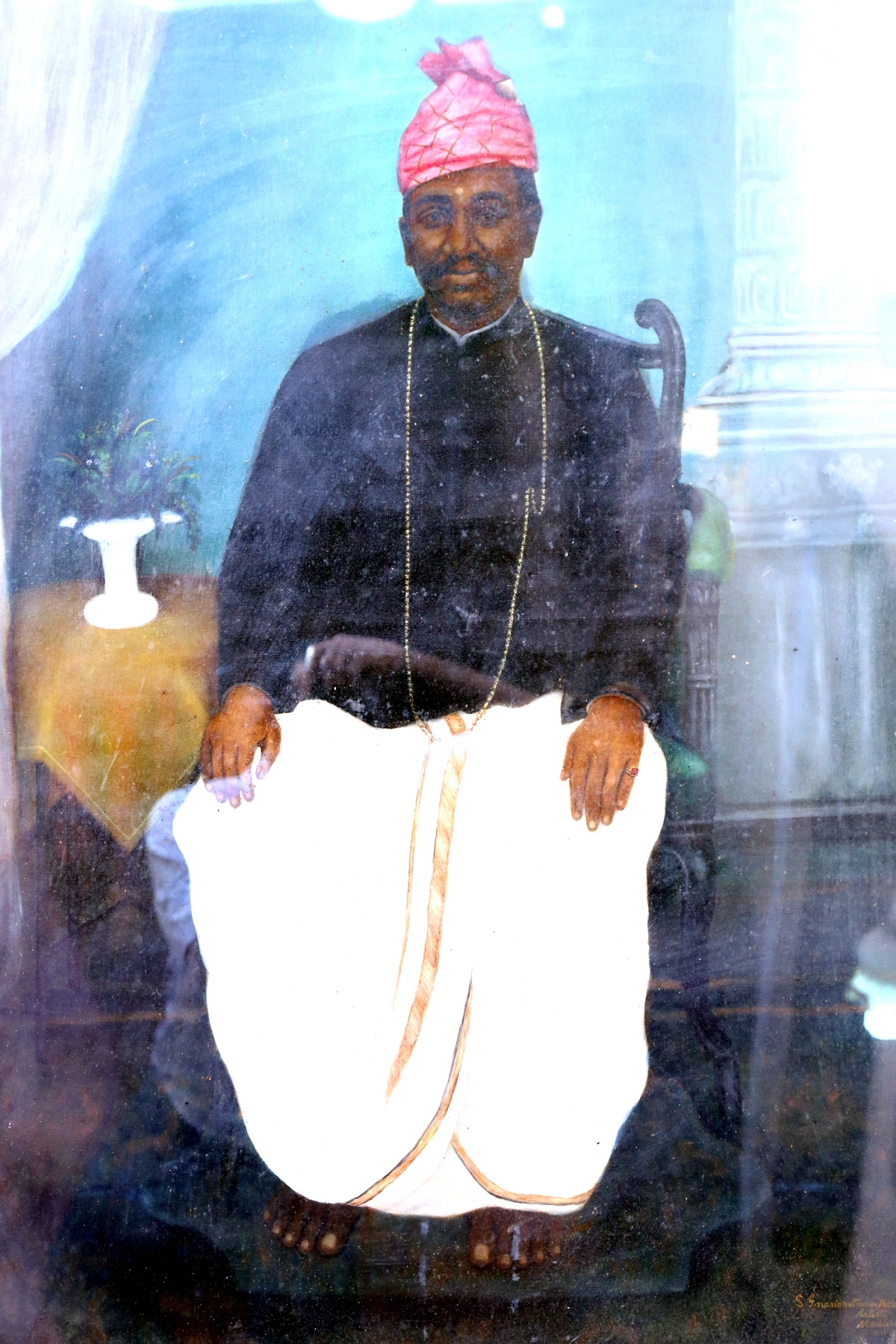
Painting of Ayya Nadar (father of Soundarapandian Nadar) by Gnanaratnam Pillai in 1919. Family collection.

Nadar came from a prominent coffee planter family that owned estates near Kodaikanal. He was the principal leader of the Nadars from the 1920s to 1930s.

== Career ==
Nadar served as a member of the Madras Legislative Council from 1920 to 1937. He represented the interests of the Nadar community in the Justice Party as well as the council. He also served as the President of the Ramnad District board from 1928 to 1930 and Madura District Board from 1943 to 1947.

== Social activism ==
Invoking the ideologies of Periyar, he urged Nadars to advocate Self-Respect marriages. He was selected by Periyar as the president of the first self-respect conference held in 1929. It is also rumoured that he had provided financial support for the Anti-Hindi agitation of 1937-40. Acknowledging the agitation's popular support, Lord Erskine, the then Governor of Madras wrote to Viceroy Linlithgow in July 1938 that "Compulsory Hindi has been the cause of great trouble in this province and is certainly contrary to the wishes of the bulk of the population..."

== Social reform ==
Nadar also worked for the upliftment of Dalits and Tiyyas, and for other social causes. He succeeded in putting an end to the Kamudi punitive tax.

== Later life ==
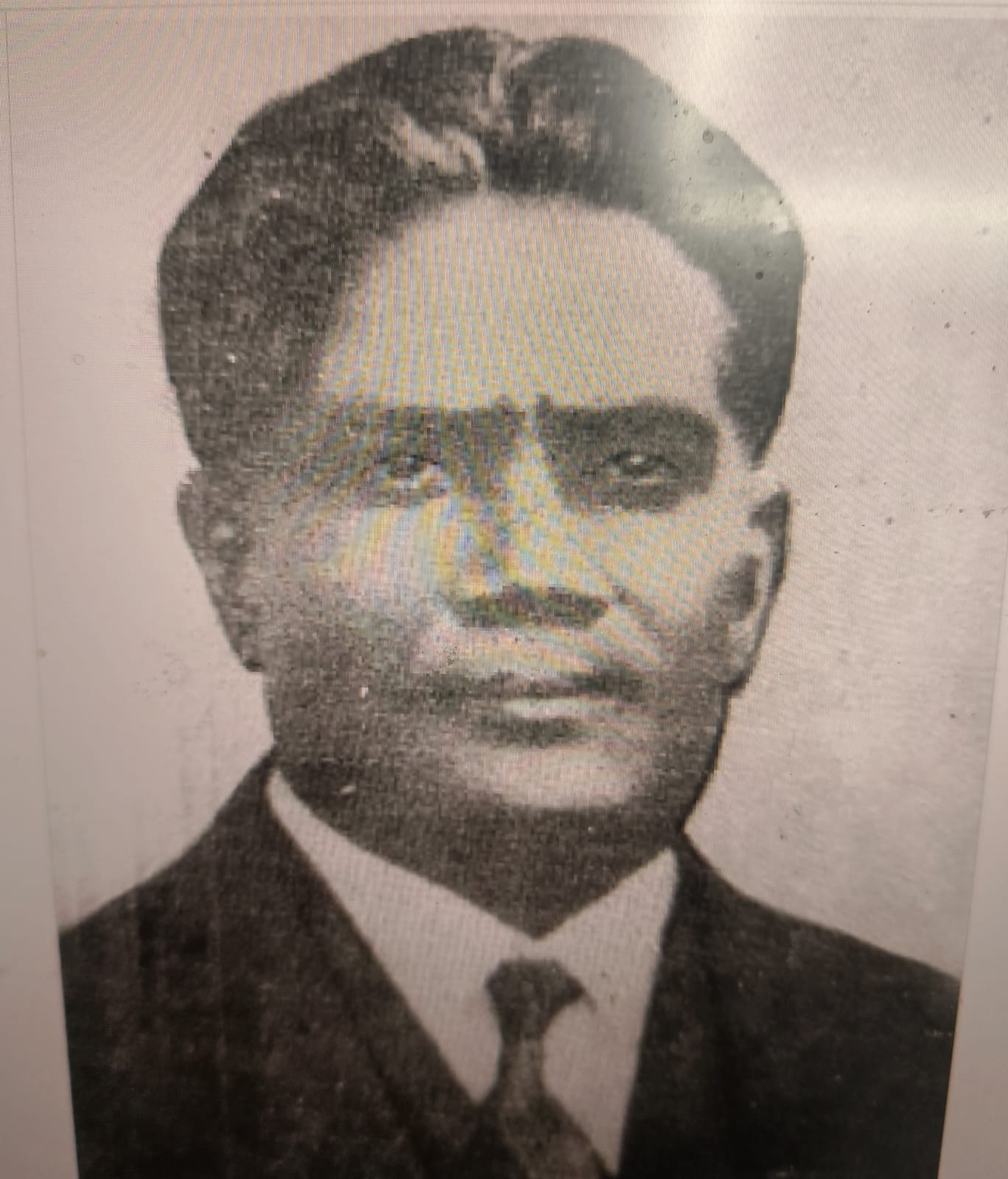
WPA Soundarapandianad Nadar

The Justice Party government of the Raja of Bobbili (1932–36) was infamous throughout the province for its corruption and misgovernance. Hence, by the mid-1930s, despite Soundarapandian's personal charisma, the influence of the Justice Party began to wane. Moreover, the social reform measures such as the Temple Entry Authorization and Indemnity Act of 1939 introduced by the Indian National Congress government of C. Rajagopalachari and the rise of the Indian National Congress leader K. Kamaraj within the ranks of the Nadar community triggered Soundarapandian Nadar's political decline. By the time Kamaraj became the president of the Tamil Nadu Congress Committee in the early 1940s, most of the Nadar community leaders had shifted their allegiance to the Indian National Congress and supported the Indian Independence Movement.

== Commemoration ==
Pondy Bazaar, Chennai's principal shopping district, is believed to have been named after Soundarapandian Nadar. A statue of the leader was erected at the entrance of the bazaar, and a signboard was set up with the bazaar's name mentioned as "Soundarapandian Angadi". The bronze statue was sculpted by Nagappa Jagannathan and unveiled by the government of Kalaignar Karunanidhi in the presence of Thiru Sivandi Adathinar.

Nadar was also active in setting up schools for the Nadar community in his home town, kayamozhi. He is referred to as "the uncrowned king of the Nadar community" in many books and papers related to the Self Respect Movement.

He was also instrumental in setting up the coffee cooperative curing works in Pattiveeranpatti.

His descendants continue to live in Pattiveeranpatti.
