= T. Rattinasami Nadar =

Rao Bahadur T. Rattinasami Nadar was the founder of Nadar Mahajana Sangam. He founded the organisation with a number of leaders from Nadar community under the presidency of his uncle in 1910.

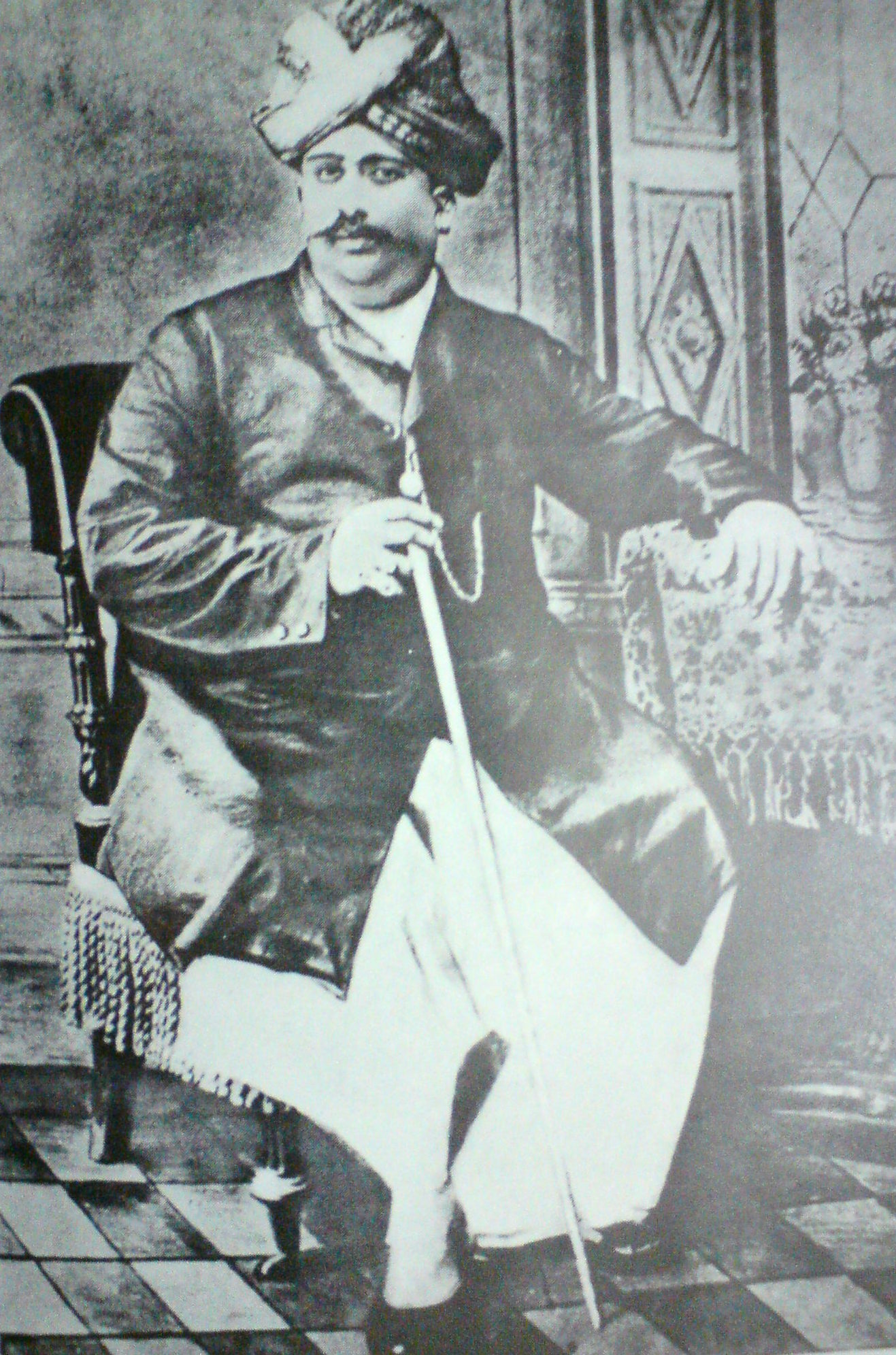
Rao Bahadur T. Rattinasami Nadar, founder of the Nadar Mahajana Sangam

The Sangam was founded to extend demands for membership in the Madras Legislative Council.

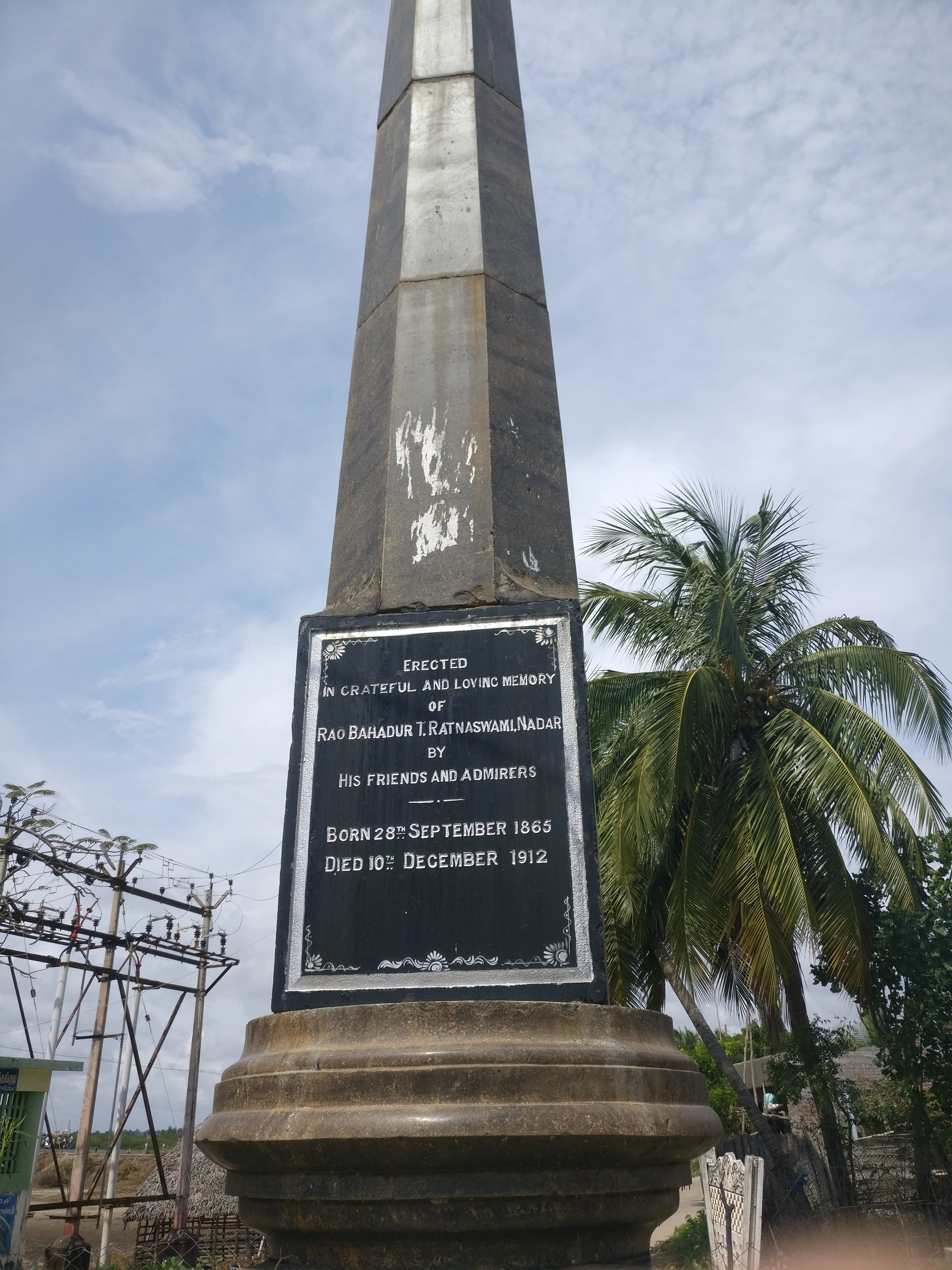
Monument of Rattnasami Nadar at Tharangambadi

Rattinasami Nadar died one year after the founding of the Sangam.
