= Kakkan =

- Theatrical release poster
- Directed by: Prabhu Manikkam
- Produced by: Joseph Baby
- Starring: Joseph Baby; Kumar Manigandan
- Music by: Thenisai Thendral Deva
- Release date: 25 August 2023
- Country: India
- Language: Tamil

Kakkan is a 2023 Indian Tamil-language biographical film directed by Prabhu Manikkam, with music composed by Thenisai Thendral Deva and starring Joseph Baby and Kumar Manigandan in the lead roles. It is based on the life of politician P. Kakkan, and was released on 25 August 2023.

== Cast ==
- Joseph Baby
- Kumar Manigandan

== Production ==
In July 2023, Tamil Nadu Chief Minister M. K. Stalin released the film's soundtrack at a ceremony, with Kakkan's daughter Kasthuri Bai and his granddaughter and IPS Rajeshwari, in attendance.

== Soundtrack ==
The film's soundtrack and background score were composed by Thenisai Thendral Deva, with lyrics written by Ekadesi. All the songs were sung by Velmurugan. The soundtrack was released under the Saregama Tamil label. All songs were programmed by Krish Siva and Darryl Jerald Thomas, with Sridhar on Indian percussion. Harmonies were provided by Velu, Aravindh Annest, Vijay, Padmaja, Triya Dushma, and Lavanya. The tracks were recorded, mixed, and mastered at Ammatalkies by S. Saranraj, with Chandrasekar serving as the program coordinator. The album consists of two songs:

No.	Song	Singer(s)	Lyricist	Composer	Reference
1	"Kakkan Endra Mamanidhan"	Velmurugan	Ekadesi	Thenisai Thendral Deva	
2	"Oru Ezhai Deivam"	Velmurugan	Ekadesi	Thenisai Thendral Deva	

The songs received a positive response from audiences, with particular praise for Deva’s melodic composition and Velmurugan’s rendition. “Kakkan Endra Mamanidhan” was noted as a strong comeback for the composer after a long hiatus.

== Reception ==
The film was released on 25 August 2023 across theatres in Tamil Nadu. A critic from Vikatan praised the political aspects of the film but drew suspicion of the historical accuracy.

Post-release, the Tamil Nadu government granted a tax exemption for the film.
