= Borewells in India =

Mechanically drilled groundwater wells widely used in India

Borewells in India are narrow-diameter, mechanically drilled wells used to extract groundwater from deep aquifers. They have become one of the most widespread groundwater extraction systems in the country since the late twentieth century. As of the latest national assessment, groundwater forms the dominant source of irrigation and rural household supply.

== History and development ==
Mechanised borewell drilling expanded rapidly after the 1960s, in parallel with the Green Revolution in India. Subsidised electricity for pump-sets, easier access to credit, and crop diversification policies encouraged groundwater extraction. By the 1980s and 1990s, borewells had spread widely across the Indo-Gangetic plains and the hard-rock regions of peninsular India.

== Technical characteristics ==
Borewell drilling in India employs methods such as rotary drilling, down-the-hole (DTH) drilling and percussion drilling, chosen according to local geology.

Common components include casing pipes, slotted screens, gravel packing and submersible pumps. In the Indo-Gangetic Plain, borewells are typically shallow, while hard-rock regions in the south require deeper drilling and show variable yields.

== Regulation ==
Groundwater extraction is monitored by the Central Ground Water Authority (CGWA) under the Environment Protection Act, 1986. Assessment units are classified as safe, semi-critical, critical or over-exploited based on extraction levels.

Several states, including Maharashtra, Tamil Nadu, Karnataka and Punjab, operate their own groundwater legislation.

== Environmental concerns ==
=== Depletion ===
Multiple hydrological studies record long-term groundwater decline in parts of northern and southern India. A peer-reviewed hydrological assessment noted significant storage loss in northwestern India due to agricultural extraction.

=== Water quality ===
CGWB reports groundwater contamination involving fluoride, arsenic, nitrates and salinity in various regions.

=== Abandoned borewells ===
Uncovered or unused borewells pose safety hazards, with several reported incidents involving children falling into narrow shafts.

== Conservation and management ==
According to data from the Central Water Commission, India receives approximately 4,000 billion cubic meters of annual rainfall, of which only 8% is currently harvested.

Major government initiatives include:

- Atal Bhujal Yojana (2020–25) for community-based groundwater management.
- Jal Shakti Abhiyan for rainwater harvesting and aquifer recharge.
- State mandates on rainwater harvesting (e.g., Tamil Nadu, Karnataka).
- Construction of check-dams, percolation tanks, recharge shafts and pits.

== Regional variations ==
- Indo-Gangetic Plains: Higher storage, but critical extraction in parts of Punjab and Haryana.
- Peninsular India: Hard-rock aquifers requiring deeper drilling and showing lower success rates.
- Coastal India: Salinity intrusion due to over-extraction.

== See also ==
- Groundwater in India
- Water supply and sanitation in India
- Irrigation in India
- Rainwater harvesting
- Tube well
- Green Revolution in India
