= Pattiveeranpatti =

- Village
- Location in Tamil Nadu, India
- Coordinates: 10°12′43″N 77°44′42″E
- Country: India
- State: Tamil Nadu
- District: Dindigul

Population (2001)
  - Total: 7,744

Languages
  - Official: Tamil
- Time zone: UTC+5:30 (IST)
- PIN: 624211
- Telephone code: 04543

Pattiveeranpatti is a panchayat town in Dindigul district in the Indian state of Tamil Nadu.

== Demographics ==
According to the 2011 Indian census, Pattiveeranpatti has a population of 8,602. Males constitute 48% of the population and females 52%. Pattiveeranpatti has an average literacy rate of 82%, higher than the national average of 59.5%. Male literacy is 86%, and female literacy is 79%. 8% of the population of Pattiveeranpatti are under 6 years of age.

== History ==
The history of the village dates back almost 1500 years. It was part of the ancient Pandyan Empire and later came under the reign of the Chola Empire and the Vijayanagara Empire, before coming under the rule of the Madurai Nayak dynasty.

The village is occupied by coffee growers who own the coffee estates in the Thandikudi hills area, which is part of the Palani Hills. By 1860, coffee cultivation in the Western Ghats (Lower Palani Hills range) had gained momentum and the estate owners in Pattiveeranpatti became pioneers in the development and cultivation of coffee plantations. They also developed banana and orange plantations. Their success in the cultivation of coffee coupled with their entrepreneurship paved the way for developing Pattiveeranpatti as a trading hub for coffee, cardamom, pepper, and other spices. It grew into a prosperous rural town with many large heritage bungalows that once belonged to these planters.

== Education ==
Nadar Sundara Vishalakshi Vidhyasala (NSVV) Higher Secondary School is one of the oldest institutions in Tamil Nadu state. The school was started in 1910 after a resolution was passed at the Mahajanam Conference at Poraiyar, adopting a resolution that all associations must start a school, as education was the only path to prosperity and upward caste mobility. The first administrator was W.P.A.P. Punnaivannam. In 1936 W. P. A. Soundarapandian nadar persuaded his childless uncle W.P. Sundara nadar to donate his coffee plantation and other assets in order to improve the school. Started in 1910 as a primary school, the school became a Higher Secondary School (10+2) in the year 1978. The schools bear the names of local figures Thiru Sundara nadar and his wife Vishalakshi Ammal, who donated all their assets for the education of the poor in and around the village.

The Hindu nadar Uravinmurai Paribalana Sangam currently runs a nursery school, primary school, NSVVHSS for boys, NSVVHSS for girls and NSVV Matriculation School. Nearly 6,000 students study in these schools. A boarding facility also has been provided to cater to the growing number of children coming from the nearby mountain villages.
