= S. N. M. Ubayadullah =

Indian politician (1941–2023)

Minister for Commercial Taxes Government of Tamil Nadu
- In office 2006–2011

Member of Legislative Assembly
- In office 1989–1991
- In office 1996–2001
- In office 2001–2006
- Constituency: Thanjavur constituency

Personal details
- Born: 16 June 1941 Abiramam, Ramanathapuram district, Madras Presidency, British India
- Died: 19 February 2023 (aged 81)
- Party: DMK
- Spouse: Jannath Beevi
- Children: Faritha Begum , Santhi Maideen (Late)
- Parents: Meera (Late) (father); Fathima (Late) (mother)
- Occupation: Politician
- Awards: Kalaingar Award 2020

S. N. M. Ubayadullah (Tamil: எஸ். என். எம். உபயத்துல்லா; 16 June 1941 – 19 February 2023) was an Indian politician and minister for commercial taxes in Tamil Nadu. He was born in Abiramam and had finished his PUC education. Later, he moved to Thanjavur district, where he was elected by the Thanjavur constituency as a Dravida Munnetra Kazhagam (DMK) candidate in the 1989, 1996, 2001, and 2006 elections.

Ubayadullah died on 19 February 2023, at the age of 81.
