= Nadar, Jaunpur =

Village in Uttar Pradesh, India

Nadar is a village in Jaunpur, Uttar Pradesh, India.
