= V. V. Ramasamy Nadar =

Indian politician and social activist

V. V. Ramasamy Nadar was a politician and social activist from the Indian state of Tamil Nadu. He hailed from Virudhunagar. He was an active advocate of Self-respect movements in ranks with Periyar E. V. Ramasamy and exemplified it in his own life by refusing to allow a purohit to perform wedding rituals in 1919.
