= Tamilnad Mercantile Bank =

Indian private-sector bank

Tamilnad Mercantile Bank Ltd
- Type: Public
- Traded as: NSE: TMB; BSE: 543596
- Industry: Banking and Financial Services
- Founded: 11 May 1921; 105 years ago
- Headquarters: Thoothukudi, Tamil Nadu, India
- Number of locations: 632 (2026)
- Area served: Worldwide
- Key people: Salee Sukumaran Nair (MD & CEO)
- Products: Credit cards; Consumer banking; Corporate banking; Finance and Insurance; Mortgage loans; Private banking; Wealth management
- Revenue: ▲₹5,492.85 crore (US$590 million) (2024)
- Operating income: ▲₹1,481.78 crore (US$160 million) (2024)
- Net income: ▲₹1,072.03 crore (US$110 million) (2024)
- Total assets: ▲₹97,296.61 crore (US$10 billion) (2024)
- Number of employees: 4,861 (2026)
- Capital ratio: 29.37% (2024)
- Website: www.tmb.bank.in

Tamilnad Mercantile Bank Limited (TMB), headquartered in Thoothukudi, Tamil Nadu, is one of India's oldest private sectore bank. Founded in 1921, the bank was originally established under a different name and was renamed Tamilnad Mercantile Bank in November 1962.

== History ==
Old logo, used till 2012

The history of Tamilnad Mercantile Bank dates back to 1921. The idea to establish a bank for the business community was first proposed at the annual meeting of the Mahajana Sangam held at Thoothukudi in 1920.

The bank was originally registered on 11 May 1921, as The Bank Limited, under the Indian Companies Act, 1913. M. V. Shanmugavel was elected as the first chairman on 4 November 1921. The bank was opened to the public by T. V. Balagurusamy on 11 November 1921 in Ana Mavanna Building at South Raja Street, Thoothukudi.

In 1937, the Bank opened a branch in Sri Lanka, but by 1939 it had closed it.

By 1947, the bank had only four branches: Thoothukudi, Madurai, Sivakasi and Virudhunagar. The bank opened its first Indian branch outside the state of Tamil Nadu in 1976 at Bengaluru.

The bank was formerly known as The Nadar Bank Ltd. and changed its name to Tamilnad Mercantile Bank Limited in November 1962.

The first fully computerised branch was opened at WGC Road, Thoothukudi on 9 December 1984. The Bank launched its ATM Card on 11 November 2003.

On 6 September 2021, the Tamilnad Mercantile Bank filed a draft red herring prospectus with the Securities and Exchange Board of India to raise funds through an initial public offering. On 7 June 2022, the company received approval from the Securities and Exchange Board of India for its Initial public offering.

Tamilnad Mercantile Bank got listed on the stock exchanges (BSE and NSE) on September 15, 2022, following its initial public offering (IPO) which ran from September 5 to September 7, 2022.

== Technology initiatives ==
Tamilnad Mercantile Bank was the first private sector bank in India to introduce computerisation for branch-level operations. The bank adopted modernization as early in the year 1983. Today all 509 branches of the bank are networked using Infosys's "FINACLE" Software and have achieved 100% connectivity.

RTGS/NEFT facilities in ebanking have been successfully implemented. The bank has also entered into an agreement with BillDesk (India ideas.com), CCAvenue (Avenues India), SBI ePay, Atom Technologies and PayU India for providing payment gateway services to the internet banking customers. It was the first old bank to have introduced mobile banking and providing POS machines to their Customers.

Tie-up arrangement made with Western Union Money Transfer, UAE Exchange & Financial Services...etc. for remittances from abroad to India to facilitate quick receipt of remittances by the beneficiaries. The bank has tie-up agreement with ICICI Prudential Mutual Fund, UTI Mutual Fund, Reliance Mutual Fund, Franklin Templeton Mutual Fund, Birla Sun Life Mutual Fund, Sundaram Mutual Fund and HDFC Mutual Fund for selling their Mutual Fund Products. The bank became a Depository participant through NSDL to make available Demat facilities. TMB was the first bank in south India to offer ASBA facilities. It also offers off-line and online share-trading through Religare Securities. TMB entered the commodity futures market by becoming a clearing bank for NCDEX and MCX. It was one of the first banks in the banking industry to have online deposit opening through the TMB e-connect facility.

TMB has introduced "Choose Your Account Number" facility for anywhere banking account holders and introduced Missed Call Banking to check Account Balance, BSNL bill payment through branches and RuPay Debit Card.

== Foreign exchange ==
The bank achieved a turnover of ₹15,726 crores in foreign exchange for the year ended March 2019. In terms of forex turnover, TMB ranks first among the Tamil Nadu-based private sector banks. With a view to provide enhanced facilities to the bank's customers, the bank shifted its foreign exchange department from Tuticorin to Chennai, and created an integrated Treasury and Foreign Exchange Operations Department with adequate infrastructure to handle trading in Government Securities, Bonds, Shares, foreign exchange and derivatives. TMB is a member of the Society for Worldwide Interbank Financial Telecommunication (SWIFT).

== Operations ==
TMB has tie-up arrangements with IDBI Bank (136 locations), and HDFC Bank (531 locations).

The bank operates a nationwide network of 594 fully computerized and interconnected branches.

As of March 2026, the bank maintained a total workforce of 4,799 employees.

== Controversies ==
In 2021 the directors of the bank were fined on two occasions. Once for an amount of ₹11.33 crores and ₹5.33 crores for another. The fine was for authorising transfer of shares to foreign entities such as RST Limited, Katra Holdings Limited, GHI I Limited, Kamehameha (Mauritius) Limited, FI Investments (Mauritius) Limited, Cuna Group (Mauritius) Limited, and Swiss Re Investors (Mauritius) Limited, Sub-Continental Equities Ltd, Mauritius, and Robert & Adris James Company Limited, Mauritius not authorised by Reserve Bank of India for acquiring shares in the bank.

== Management ==
As of 2026, the board of directors of Tamilnad Mercantile Bank includes.

- Thiru. K. Ramachandran - Independent Director (Non Executive Part-Time Chairman)
- Thiru. Salee S Nair - Managing Director and CEO
- Thiru. Vincent Menachery - Executive Director
- Thiru A. Niranjan Sankar - Non Executive Director
- Thiru C. Chiranjeeviraj - Independent Director
- Thiru C.S. Ram Kumar - Additional Director, RBI
- Thiru.S.Sridharan - Independent Director
- Thiru K.V.Rama Moorthy - Non-Executive Director
- Thiru R.Deepak Shankar - Independent Director
- Tmt. R.Kanagavalli - Independent Director
- Thiru. A.Shidambaranathan - Independent Director
- Thiru. S.R.Aravind Kumar - Non-Executive Director
- Thiru. R.Kodeeswaran - Non-Executive Director
- Thiru. V.Srinivasan - Additional Director, RBI Nominee

== See also ==
- Banking in India
- List of banks in India
- Reserve Bank of India
- Indian Financial System Code
